= Characters of Casualty =

British television series characters

Casualty is a British medical drama television series that premiered on 6 September 1986 on BBC1. The series was created by Jeremy Brock and Paul Unwin. It is set in the fictional Holby City Hospital, in the equally fictitious city of Holby, and features occasional crossovers of characters and plots with spin-off show Holby City. Casualty follows the professional and personal lives of the doctors, nurses, paramedics, hospital management and patients at Holby General. It features an ensemble cast of regular characters, and began with ten main characters in its first series, including the longest-serving character Charlie Fairhead (played by Derek Thompson). They have all since left the series. Many main characters have been written in and out of the series since. In addition, Casualty features guest stars each week, as well as recurring guests that take part in story arcs that span a portion of a series or multiple series.

== Main characters ==
=== A ===
==== Matthew Afolami ====
Matthew Afolami, portrayed by Osi Okerafor, first appears in the thirty-fifth series, in an episode originally broadcast on 29 May 2021. The character and Okerafor's casting was announced on 20 May 2021, alongside that of Elinor Lawless in the role of Stevie Nash. Matthew is billed as an experienced locum registrar who has worked in "trouble spots" across the world. The character shares a backstory with established character Fenisha Khatri (Olivia D'Lima); she jilted him on their wedding day, something which is explored in his first episode through flashbacks. Loretta Preece, the show's series producer, praised the relationship between Okerafor and D'Lima. Writers used Matthew's introduction to create tension between Fenisha and her love interest, Ethan Hardy (George Rainsford). Okerafor expressed his joy at joining the cast and looked forward to playing Matthew's devotion to his patients, something which he liked. Preece praised Okerafor for his talent, describing him as "handsome and debonair, sensitive and steadfast, [and] passionate and unpredictable". She added that his "beautifully layered performance" would develop the character further than being a "classic romantic leading man".

==== Rida Amaan ====
Rida Amaan, portrayed by Sarah Seggari, made her debut appearance in the series thirty-seven episode "Welcome to the Warzone", broadcast on 8 April 2023. The character and Seggari's casting was confirmed alongside a new cohort of nurses being introduced to the programme on 23 March 2023.

For her portrayal of Rida, Seggari received a nomination in the "Soaps - Best Actor" category the 2025 Digital Spy Reader Awards. The plot in which Russell Whitelaw (Robert Bathurst) sexually assaults Rida was nominated for "Best Soap Storyline".

==== Paige Allcott ====
Paige Allcott, portrayed by Shalisha James-Davis, first appears in the thirty-sixth series, in an episode originally broadcast on 8 January 2022. The character and James-Davis' casting was confirmed on 8 January 2022, just hours prior to transmission of her first episode. Paige is introduced as a bartender, who is joining the medical profession, and arrives in the E.D. after having an accident at the bar she worked at, where she handcuffed herself to a customer to stop him from falling over a railing. Paige introduces herself to the team at the E.D. as the new F1 Doctor, and this is soon established. Paige's storylines have included her relationship with Clinical fellow, Rashid Masum, being tested for the BRCA1 gene, and nearly losing her medical licence after a lack of support from her mentor, Stevie Nash. James-Davies made an unannounced departure on 24 February 2024, in a story arc which saw Paige decide to move to another specialty, and leave the department behind.

==== Jez Andrews ====
Jez Andrews, played by Lloyd Everitt, made his first screen appearance on 12 March 2016. The character and Everitt's casting was announced on 29 January 2016, whilst further details were announced on 24 February 2016 with the casting of David Hide (Jason Durr) and Elle Gardner (Jaye Griffiths). Executive producer Oliver Kent described the three castings as "wonderful" and said their storylines would be "brilliantly vibrant, bold and gripping". Jez is characterised as a "young, ludicrously handsome and very openly bisexual" paramedic.

Cheeky, easy-going and full of banter, Jez is a fresh-faced, newly-qualified paramedic with bags of energy. Jez doesn't take life too seriously, which means he gets on well with everybody and loves a good flirt. It's just a shame that this enthusiasm isn't always applied to his job... Like a distracted puppy, Jez can be difficult to control in a perilous situation, much to Iain's frustration.

— Casualty website (2016)

Kent teased the dynamic between Jez and his paramedic colleague, Iain Dean (Michael Stevenson), calling it "fun" and "unlike anything we've seen before". Tasha Hegarty of Digital Spy described Jez as "Iain's new partner in crime". It was announced that Jez would "fail to impress" Iain with his "cheeky banter and lax attitude" upon his arrival, and would struggle to replace Iain's former colleague, Dixie Dixon (Jane Hazlegrove). Kent also revealed that a "big" friendship would be established between Jez and Max Walker (Jamie Davis). Everitt had already filmed his first scenes when his casting was announced and revealed that his favourite thing to film had been a scene where he rescued a girl from falling from a cliff, "I actually felt it was a real life situation and that excited me." Of his casting, Everitt said, "I feel honoured to be joining such a successful show and look forward to bringing a different essence to a programme that's synonymous with British culture and television. It's actually the first programme I remember watching when I was a child at my Nan's house – there's a great beauty to that."

Jez arrived and tried flirting with Connie Beauchamp (Amanda Mealing) until his colleague, Iain Dean (Michael Stevenson), revealed she was the department's clinical lead. Jez and Iain escorted Emilie Groome (Carol Royle) to a hospice, where she would spend her final days. They stop the ambulance during the journey whilst her sons and doctors, Ethan Hardy (George Rainsford) and Caleb Knight (Richard Winsor), treat her. Jez allows Cal to steal the ambulance so he can take Emilie to the seaside. Jez then spends the rest of the day trying to impress Iain with his banter whilst they search for a lift back to the hospital. Jez finally wins Iain over and they receive a lift back to the hospital. Jez installs a basketball hoop in the ambulance bay and befriends Max Walker (Jamie Davis), who often spends time playing basketball with Jez. Max and Robyn Miller (Amanda Henderson) then begin renting a room to Jez.

Jez went on a night out with Isaac Mayfield, after he had a row with boyfriend Dominic Copeland resulting in a one-night stand. This eventually leads to Mayfield physically, sexually and emotionally abusing Copeland in sister show Holby City, resulting in his dismissal. He later pursues Louise Tyler (Azuka Oforka) and, although she tells him she is uncomfortable knowing he has been with both men and women, he eventually wins her over and the two go on a date. He later expresses concerns to Iain that he thinks Louise expects too much after she invites him to an expensive restaurant. He bails on their date, wanting to avoid being embarrassed because he can't afford any of the food and hooks up with a guy. To his horror, Jez wakes up in the young man's bed and discovers that he is Elle's son. He is injured after falling from Elle's drainpipe in his attempt to hide from her. Her son later visits the hospital to give Jez his ID which he had left behind, leading Elle to find out about them sleeping together. Although angry at first, Elle eventually calms down and tells Jez to use the front door next time he wants to stay over.

When Roy Ellisson is brought into the ED following a fight, he abuses Jez in the ambulance for being black and "queer". Jez later reveals that he knows the man Roy was fighting with from bars in town. He tries to support Mickey Ellisson after discovering that he is gay and helps him apologize to the man his father beat up. He encourages Mickey to come out and provides reassurance when Roy rejects him. After his father dies, Mickey goes to see Jez at the ambulance station and the two share a kiss.

Jez and Mickey commence a relationship, keeping it a secret from Mickey's family. Mickey participates in a race-related assault on a shopkeeper and is injured during the getaway, landing him back in the ED. When Mickey is almost discovered, he racially insults Jez to demonstrate his loyalty to his brother. Grieving and seething with injustice, Ethan reveals Mickey's relationship to Scott. Scott goes to attack Jez, but Mickey shields him and says he made the wrong choice. Scott attacks them with a knife, and in the struggle is tossed over a second floor balcony, leaving him badly injured. Denise arrives and disowns Mickey, and Scott later dies.

The 'shot-in-one-take' episode "One" opens with Jez bravely dragging a Korean woman from a burning building. He finds out that her baby was left behind in the building, which leaves him devastated. This event completely shatters Jez's confidence and he begins to take sick days from work. He freezes up when a fire is started in his apartment and Robyn tries to pass him her baby. Because of the timing of the fire, it is concluded that Jez was targeted in the attack, and that Denise Ellisson was involved. This event is the last straw for Mickey who says he is going travelling and invites Jez to come with him so they can escape everything and start anew. Jez wonders what he has to lose at this point and considers joining him, but when he reacts quickly and saves Robin's baby from choking, he appears to be at peace with staying at Holby. After a talk with Iain he changes his mind and meets Mickey at the airport. The Holby staff later receive photographs of the couple relaxing in Mexico.

==== Linda Andrews ====
Linda Andrews, played by Christine Tremarco, made her debut appearance in the twentieth episode of the twenty-fourth series, broadcast on 16 January 2010. Linda was originally introduced to aid the departure of Jessica Harrison (Gillian Kearney), who she trained to be a nurse with. Linda told Jessica that she is moving to America and "almost flippant remarked" that Jessica join her, which she agreed to. Tremarco reprised the role as a regular cast member in 2011 and Linda returned to the hospital as a clinical nurse manager, but was later demoted to staff nurse. She was billed as a "fun-loving nurse" who is "determined to become more sensible." Tremarco said she was "delighted" to be invited back to the show, adding that it was "so exciting joining a long-running show" and how "everyone has given me such a warm welcome". To prepare for the role, Tremarco observed a real nurse, who "was incredibly helpful" because she is a "squeamish person". Tremarco described Linda as "a party girl" with an "attitude that she's young free and single". She added that she was "fun and outgoing", but had "a heart of gold" and would "do anything for anyone."

The show introduced Linda's family in 2012, beginning with her "recovering drug addict" sister Denise Andrews (Kate McEvoy) who hasn't had "any contact in years". Of Denise's introduction, producer Nikki Wilson said, "Denise suddenly arrives with two kids in tow, and leaves them with Linda. So party girl Linda finds herself responsible for two children – which will affect her working life in a big way." Wilson also teased a possible romance between Linda and Lenny Lyons (Steven Miller), noting that they have a "really sparky relationship". The character departed from the series in the thirty-fifth episode of the twenty-seventh series, broadcast on 11 May 2013. The exit had only been revealed through advanced spoilers beforehand.

==== Martin "Ash" Ashford ====
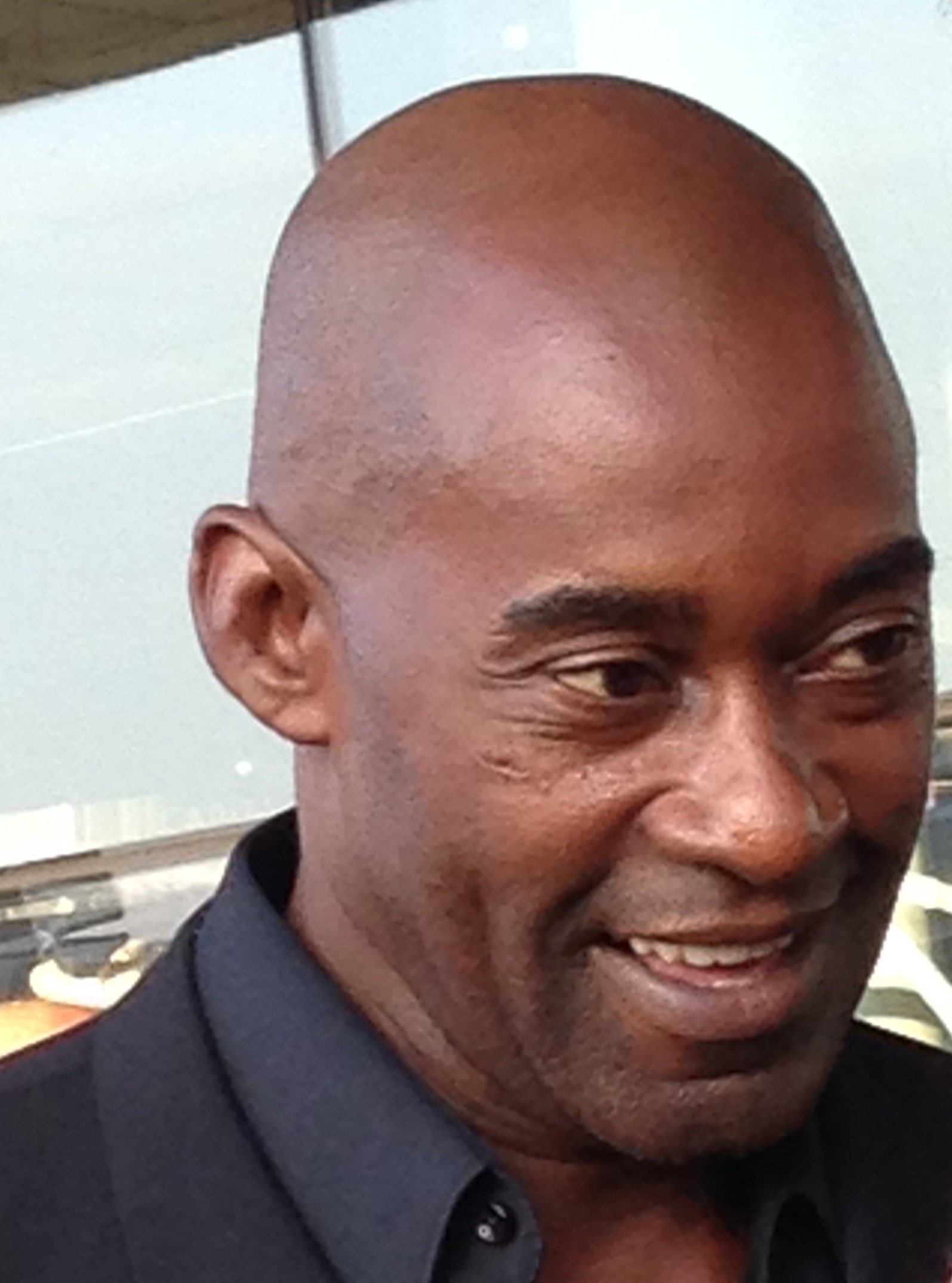
Patrick Robinson (pictured) portrayed Martin "Ash" Ashford.

Martin "Ash" Ashford, played by Patrick Robinson, made his first appearance in the series five episode "Penalty", originally broadcast on 7 September 1990. Robinson was cast in 1990 and was surprised to receive a call for the role. Ash is characterised as a man of principle with high aspirations and a caring nature. He is well-respected in the department, where he also serves as the union representative. The character was used to explore the topic of racism in series nine, a story which Robinson disapproved of. In the character's next story, he was given a love interest: public relations officer Laura Milburn (Lizzy McInnerny). This culminated in a wedding during the series ten finale. Robinson decided to leave Casualty in 1995, having become disillusioned with the show. Ash and Laura depart together in the series 10 finale "Night Moves", originally broadcast on 24 February 1996. Robinson reprised the role for the two-part series 12 finale in 1998, with Ash acting as best man at Charlie Fairhead's (Derek Thompson) wedding.

The character's reintroduction was announced in 2013, fifteen years since his last appearance; he returns in the series twenty-seven episode "If Not for You", originally broadcast on 9 February 2013. Ash becomes the department's new consultant, having retrained in America. The character's stories following his reintroduction included the introduction of his teenage daughter Ella Ashford (Tahirah Sharif), bullying junior doctor Lily Chao (Crystal Yu), and a friendship with Rita Freeman (Chloe Howman). Ash was written out of the show off-screen in 2015, making his final appearance in the series 29 episode "Solomon's Song", originally broadcast on 13 December 2014. The character received a positive reception from television critics, with a reporter from The Telegraph including Ash in the show's ten best characters.

==== Lloyd Asike ====
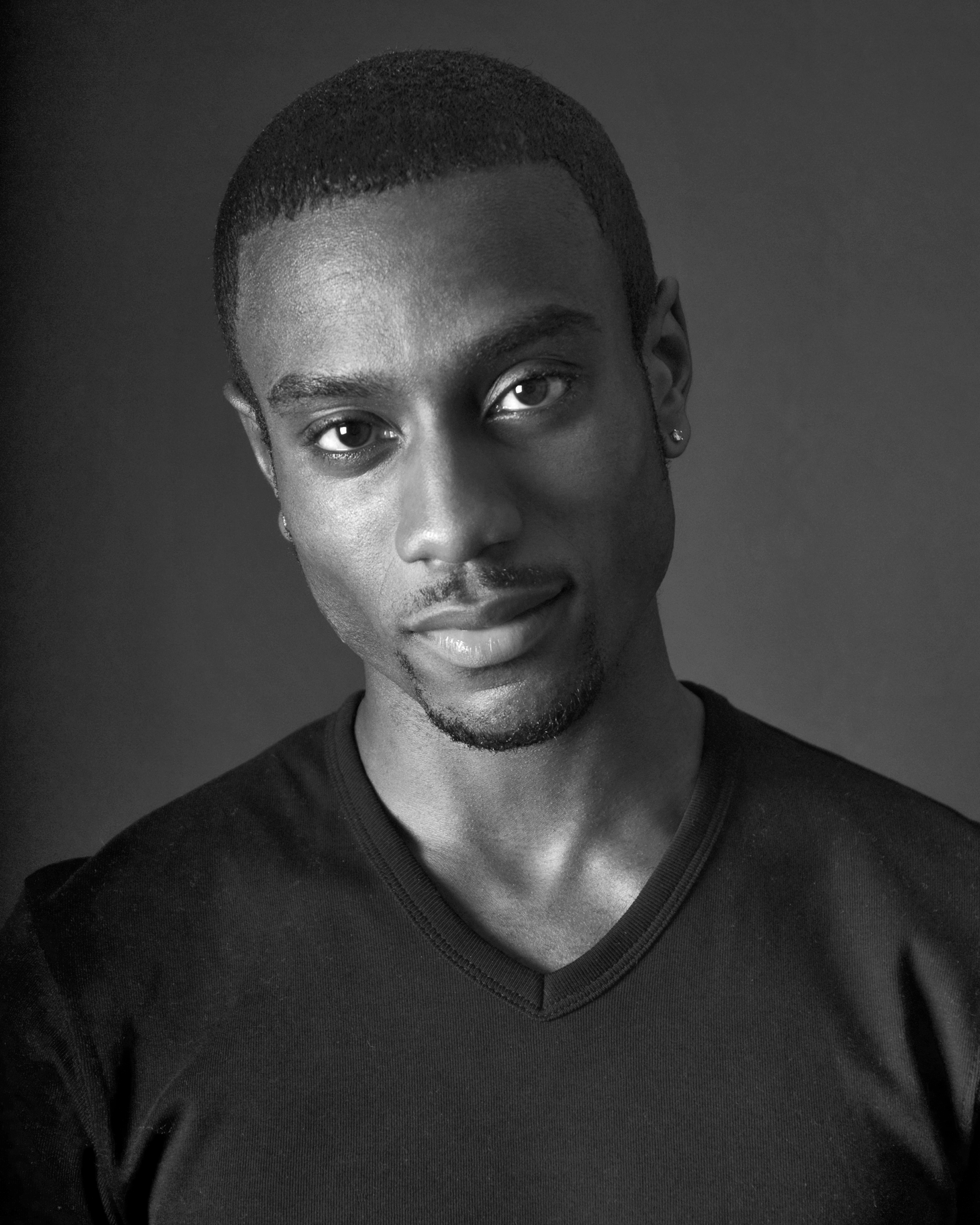
Michael Obiora appeared in the show as nurse Lloyd Asike for two years.

Lloyd Asike, played by Michael Obiora, is a staff nurse who first appeared on 20 August 2011, alongside Scarlett Conway (Madeleine Mantock). Lloyd and Scarlett's casting were revealed in an interview that Digital Spy published with executive producer, Oliver Kent on 6 July 2011. Lloyd left Casualty on 8 June 2013 after deciding to retrain as a doctor.

Upon his arrival, Lloyd was mentored by Jay Faldren (Ben Turner) and it slowly becomes clear that Lloyd has feelings for Scarlett and following the massive fire at the hospital, he admits his feelings to her and they begin a relationship. Their relationship ends abruptly when she hands herself in for throwing a brick at a police officer during the Holby Riots. His mum, Florence and sister, Shelia appear towards the end of series 26.

In an interview with Digital Spy in 2011, producer Oliver Kent announced the casting of Michael Obiora as Lloyd Asike. Obiora's casting was announced at the same time as Scarlett Conway (Madeleine Mantock). He said, "We're bringing in two new nurses at the start of the new series – Lloyd Asike and Scarlett Conway. We're very excited about the castings. Lloyd is played by the brilliant Michael Obiora, who viewers will probably know from Hotel Babylon, EastEnders and Grange Hill. He's phenomenal." In 2012, producer Nikki Harris spoke to Inside Soap about whether Lloyd was going to have a relationship with Scarlett. She said, "I couldn't possibly say yet – just keep watching! What's interesting about the pair of characters is the question of identity. Lloyd is from a very strong, cultural black background and is very rooted in his origins, whereas Scarlett was brought up in a white family. So we're really interested in exploring the two differences in identity between the two."

=== B ===
==== Mike Barratt ====
Mike Barratt, played by Clive Mantle, made his first appearance during the seventh series. Mike was a consultant, who formed a relationship with staff nurse Rachel Longworth (Jane Gurnett). He became a popular member of the cast and was branded a "heart-throb". Mantle left at the end of series eleven, but briefly returned during the following series. Of his decision to leave the show, Mantle said "I didn't want to see the audience always expecting him to be there and perhaps taking less notice of him. I've had a great time, but I'm frightened that, if I stick around too long, I'll end up unable to do anything else." The character later appeared in sister show Holby City between 1999 and 2001, as a consultant general surgeon. Mantle reprised his role for the 30th anniversary episode "Too Old for This Shift", which aired in August 2016.

==== Tess Bateman ====
Tess Bateman, played by Suzanne Packer, is a ward sister who first appeared on 13 September 2003. From her arrival until 2005, Tess was an emergency nurse practitioner and following that, she was promoted to clinical nurse manager for six years, until 2011. In May 2011, Tess resigned from her position and resumed the role of ward sister, but was later reinstated. Tess continued in the role until January 2015 when she resigned to help set up a new health centre as a secondment, returning as a ward sister shortly after. Packer chose to leave the role in 2015, with Tess departing on 22 August 2015. Tess left Holby to live in Leeds with her son and grandson. Packer reprised her role for the 30th anniversary episode "Too Old for This Shift", which aired in August 2016.

==== Connie Beauchamp ====
Constance "Connie" Beauchamp, played by Amanda Mealing, originally appeared in Casualty's spin off show, Holby City, in the role of Cardiothoracic Consultant and Clinical Lead of Holby's Darwin Cardiothoracic Ward. Connie later went on to become Director of Surgery and medical director of Holby City Hospital. During this period, she appeared in the first two crossovers between Casualty and Holby City, featuring the casts of both shows, and made a guest appearance in the Casualty episode shown 9 September 2007. She departed from the show in its thirteenth series, resigning from her post. Her return was announced on 23 July 2013 and she arrived in Casualty on 29 March 2014.

==== Big Mac ====
Mackenzie "Big Mac" Chalker, played by Charles Dale, first appeared on 24 November 2007. He was a porter until October 2013, when he applied to become an emergency care assistant. However, he quit this role in November 2014 and applied to be a healthcare assistant instead. He hasn't changed his job role since. Dale's departure was announced on 7 June 2016, after eight and a half years on the show. Big Mac's exit airs on 11 June 2016 when he decides to leave Holby. Dale since revealed he would return for a cameo appearance in the show's thirtieth anniversary specials. Dale reprised the role for a single episode as part of the show's thirty-fifth anniversary in August 2021. He expressed his excitement at reuniting with his co-stars.

Big Mac is a veteran of the Falklands War of 1982, where many of his fellow soldiers were killed while he survived. This has led to him experiencing intense feelings of guilt. The BBC describe him as "overly sensitive" and "just a little bit grouchy". An episode of series 23 devoted to the character sees him assume a vigilante role on the city's Farmead Estate. Dale states that the episode causes Mac to realise: "it's time he stood up for himself and that he can't run from things that happened in the past all his life." Describing Mac's personality, Dale appraised that Mac is "deeply introverted" and struggles to accept that his colleagues actually like him. He explained that although Mac occasionally acts pompously, this approach is "a mask that he puts on to keep people at distance when he gets afraid or embarrassed". He expanded that Mac has: "been scared to go out and he's terrified of life. But because of people in the hospital he's slowly discovering it."

Mac has a budding friendship with Noel Garcia (Tony Marshall) and Louise Tyler (Azuka Oforka). When paramedic Dixie Dixon (Jane Hazlegrove) mentioned to Louise and Mac that they were looking for a new Emergency Care Assistant, Mac showed interest and Louise completed an application on Mac's behalf. Mac was given the job and spent a day training Max Walker (Jamie Davis) to be a porter in the ED. He has also supported paramedic Iain Dean through traumatic events.

In September 2012, Mac became the centre of a big storyline which saw him have a major heart attack. Mac survived the heart attack, and according to Dale, the storyline gave Mac "a new lease of life.". Later in March 2014, Mac was held hostage alongside Iain and attacked in the ambulance bay by one of Iain's army colleagues, Kenny Archer. Mac made a full recovery and returned to work. In October 2014, following the death Jeff Collier (Matt Bardock), Mac asks for a transfer back to the ED, where he becomes a healthcare assistant.

Noel was attacked in January 2016 and whilst the attack took place, Mac hid in a nearby toilet. Noel is left seriously injured, but recovers and is left under the impression that Mac fought the attacker off. Subsequently, Noel does various good gestures for Mac including buying Mac a new motorbike. Mac continues to live with the guilt of his cowardice, whilst the attacker Mercedes Christie (Hannah Spearritt) regularly visits Mac and blackmails him in return for drugs. The investigating officers discover the truth and Mac is publicly taken away for questioning, causing him to be remonstrated by several members of the ED staff. Noel discovers the truth and ends their friendship, moving out of their apartment. The two men bicker needlessly at work until Jack Diamond (Alistair Brammer) and Robyn Miller (Amanda Henderson) lock them in a room together. Mac explains that he panicked and now felt deeply ashamed about his actions. Noel forgives him and agrees to move back in.

Mac realises that Mercedes is a deeply troubled woman and is sympathetic towards her. When Mac loses his pain medication, he grows irritable and steals painkillers from a pharmacy order he is asked to make. Mercedes catches him doing so and steals the drugs for herself. When the pharmacy reports a stock inconsistency, the suspicion of theft is raised and Mac is unable to complete Mercedes' demands, causing him to feel trapped. He tearfully confesses everything to Noel, who promises to support him and scares Mercedes away from Mac, reminding her that she risks the custody of her child (Toby Murray). Mac is recommended to a support group, but he is too ashamed to attend and quickly re-offends, stealing a patient's tramadol tablets. Charlie Fairhead (Derek Thompson) discovers this and when Mac breaks down and explains everything to Charlie, he offers to hide the drugs. Charlie hides the drugs in his locker, but an investigation into the missing drugs begins. Elle Gardner (Jaye Griffiths) discovers the drugs and reports her findings to clinical nurse manager, Rita Freeman (Chloe Howman), under the impression they belonged to Charlie. Charlie keeps his promise and is suspended, leaving Mac feeling guilty and Elle ostracised from the staff. Noel informs Mac that he knows they were Mac's drugs and orders him to tell the truth, but he avoids doing so.

Mac has a terrible day which sees him treat a girl who he discovers is being abused by her stepfather. The stepfather plays the victim by claiming that the girl is harassing him. When the truth is revealed about the abuse, the stepfather drags the girl out the ED, but Mac steps in and bravely takes a beating in order to protect her. Mac then confesses that he stole drugs and when Rita informs him he will be suspended, Mac decides to resign. He then says goodbye to his colleagues and leaves. Before he leaves, he attends a NA meeting with Charlie, where he relays his story and thanks Charlie for what he did, before leaving Holby.

==== Sah Brockner ====
Sah Brockner, played by Arin Smethurst, first appeared on 9 October 2021. Sah is Casualty's first transgender and non-binary character and the character uses they/them pronouns. Producers described Sah as a cool person who does not want to be seen as vulnerable or trying too hard, but noted that they would meet their match in boss Jan Jennings (Di Botcher), who wants to get to truly know Sah. On the character, Deborah Sathe, senior executive producer, said: "We are delighted to welcome Arin to the Casualty family and launch our new paramedic Sah for the Saturday night audience. Sah will get themselves into all sorts of professional adventures whilst masking their own personal sorrow. In a world where our privacy is something to be treasured, will Sah be able to keep theirs?"

On their casting in the series, Smethurst said: "I am honoured to be joining the spectacular Casualty family as a shiny new paramedic. I'm so excited to portray this transgender, non-binary, salty but fiercely compassionate character and hope they are not only well-received, but also a source of awareness for those who have never met someone like me." The role marked Smethurst's first television role, who graduated from college a year prior to their casting. Writing in a piece for the Metro in Pride Month, Smethurst said that being cast as Sah was "incredibly validating" for them. They explained that prior to their casting, Sah had not been given a queer identity and that their casting in the role led to producers moulding the character around Smethurst's real-life identity. Since Sah was not initially written as a non-binary character prior to this, Smethurst found it affirming that Casualty producers were not just "ticking a diversity box". On scenes where Sah's identity is not respected in the show, Smethurst explained that it was important for these scenes to be transmitted. They felt that since queer people face discriminatory comments daily, it was important to portray the attitudes that they endure. Smethurst also revealed that an overwhelming number of people had reached out to say they felt "seen, represented, emboldened, affirmed, comforted by Sah and their journey".

==== Flynn Byron ====
Flynn Byron, played by Olly Rix, first appeared on 15 March 2025. Rix's casting was confirmed in February 2025, with the BBC billing the character as 'a complex character'.

On his casting, Rix said: "It’s been a pleasure to join the Casualty cast in such a dynamic role. Flynn crashes into the world of it from a very different background, resulting in a complex and exciting story in Internal Affairs and beyond. It’s a brilliant new chapter for the show and I am excited for the audience to get to know Flynn."

=== C ===
==== Rosa Cadenas ====
Rosa Cadenas, portrayed by Jacey Sallés, made her first appearance in the thirty-third series, in an episode originally broadcast on 27 July 2019. The character and Sallés' casting details were first announced on 31 May 2019. Rosa is billed as an "outspoken and confident" hospital porter from a Venezuelan background. Sallés described Rosa as "solitary", "fabulous [and] strong", and "a passionate, spirited lady, who's full of energy". and explained that Rosa is not afraid to speak her mind and gets involved in situations that do not concern her. She is not afraid of the emergency department hierarchy and immediately introduces herself to clinical lead Connie Beauchamp (Amanda Mealing). Sallés explained that Rosa believes that "if there's a job to be done, let's not sit on formalities." The actress confirmed that the character's backstory, including the reason she moved to the UK, would be explored during the series. Sallés was contracted with the drama until October 2019 and enjoyed working on the show, hoping that her contract would be extended.

Series producer Lucy Raffety told Elaine Reilly of What's on TV that Rosa would feature in an "interesting story" with established character David Hide (Jason Durr). It was later confirmed that Rosa is a love interest for David. When Rosa arrives, she irritates her colleagues and patients by giving her opinion when it is not wanted. David becomes easily frustrated by Rosa's behaviour and tries to reprimand her. Sallés explained that David is easily wound up, but Rosa understands when to stop. When she hears David speaking in his "bumbling" manner, Rosa is attracted to him. The actress liked Durr's comic timing in the scenes and found him amusing. Sallés and Durr would often include extra unscripted movements and other things to the scene for comedic purposes or to explore their characters further. The actress appreciated how producers would allow them to do this. Sallés explained that Rosa and David would eventually become close as he is drawn to her honesty, practicality, as well as how she "cuts to the chase [and] grounds him".

On Rosa's introduction, Reilly (What's on TV) believed that the character defied the traditional Casualty introduction of "their first day on the wards is a baptism of fire". Sue Haasler, writing for the Metro, liked Rosa and predicted that she would be "a wonderful character" that she would enjoy learning more about. Describing the character, she commented, "Rosa is feisty, strong and opinionated, but she has a really warm heart and sees through the masks that people put on."

Salles made her final appearance as Rosa in the twenty-seventh episode of series thirty-six, which aired on 19 March 2022.

==== Faith Cadogan ====
Faith Cadogan, (also Dean) portrayed by Kirsty Mitchell, made her first appearance in the thirty-fourth series, in an episode originally broadcast on 28 December 2019. The character was first previewed in a show trailer, released on 5 December 2019, and Mitchell confirmed her casting on Twitter, where she expressed her excitement at joining the cast. Faith is described as an "efficient" advanced clinical practitioner (ACP) who impresses clinical lead Dylan Keogh (William Beck). The character is later revealed to be the wife of established character Lev Malinovsky (Uriel Emil). Reviewing Faith's first episode, Sue Haasler of the Metro described the character as "brilliant – skilled, calm and knowledgeable and exactly what was needed on such a terrible day." Haasler later branded Faith "super-competent" and was surprised by the Faith and Lev pairing.

==== Kim Chang ====
Kim Chang, played by Jasmine Bayes, made her first appearance on 10 January 2026 and she made an unannounced departure on 18 April 2026. She joins the emergency department as a resident doctor on rotation and is introduced alongside Matty Linlaker (Aron Julius), who she went to university with. Her backstory involves coming from a long line of doctors within her family, making her feel that she has a lot to prove. Speaking about Kim in a video for Casualty's social media, Bayes said that she is a kind, caring and studious character who likes to make people feel good. Despite her personality, Bayes stated that Kim does not believe in her skillset. She also spoke about Kim's relationship with mentor Stevie; she idolises Stevie, who in turn sees Kim's potential.

Over time, Kim is shown to be hiding a secret and is obsessed with an application on her phone. It is eventually shown to be a calorie tracking app since she has an eating disorder, atypical anorexia nervosa. Kim becomes obsessed with vomiting her food up, over-exercising and losing weight, eventually getting hold of unregulated weight loss syringes. The weight loss and syringes cause her to dramatically lose competency at work, making numerous mistakes including being responsible for the permanent paralysis of a patient. She eventually quits her job and dies from her eating disorder due to multi-organ failure. The character of Kim was created specifically to show the effects that eating disorders and weight loss syringes can have on people. Bayes found it tough to play out the story arc. However, she appreciated the decision to have her character suffer from atypical anorexia nervosa as opposed to typical anorexia nervosa, since it showed that anybody could suffer from an eating disorder, particularly in a busy work environment such as an emergency department. Her portrayal of the character was praised by critics and viewers, with Kim billed as a "fan-favourite" despite her short tenure in the series. Many viewers felt that although the story had been portrayed well, Kim deserved more time to be developed.

==== Alice Chantrey ====
Alice Chantrey, played by Sam Grey, made her first appearance on 1 April 2006. Alice joined the series as a receptionist and she later trained as a healthcare assistant. Grey chose to leave the series in 2010 and departed on 1 May 2010. It was announced on 16 August 2016 that Alice would guest appear in the show on 27 August 2016 for the show's thirtieth anniversary celebrations.

It was announced on 3 February 2006 that Grey had been cast in the role. She said of her casting: "I'm really excited to be working with such skilled and talented actors on Casualty. It's a great opportunity to learn more. At the moment my real nerves are helping me to play the part of Alice as she's an anxious character." Alice is described by the BBC as "cripplingly shy" and easily intimidated.

Alice is befriended by Sam Bateman, and develops a crush on senior house officer Guppy Sandhu. Alice goes as far as to pretend one of the porters is her boyfriend in an effort to draw his attention; however, all this achieves is helping Sam realise he has feelings for her himself. When the department is threatened with closure, consultant Harry Harper opposes the move, and Clinical Manager Nathan Spencer persuades Alice to claim that he has sexually harassed her, in order to sabotage Harry's campaign. Realising she has been tricked, Alice drops her claim and expresses a wish to leave for the South American rain forest, but Sam persuades her to stay. Later in the series, Sam himself leaves to travel in Thailand. Alice kisses him before his departure, confessing her love for him.

Alice began a relationship with paramedic Curtis Cooper, which Grey described as "a bit of a slow burn", commenting: "They've been tiptoeing around each other for a while because they both have their own issues – Alice is a nervous character and very shy, while Curtis has a past, which he tries to keep back. Although they find it difficult to communicate they get on well and hit it off in the quirkiest way possible." She assessed that Alice was initially nervous of the relationship as: "She's very naive, quite like a little girl in many ways. She's never had a proper relationship and is still a virgin. Curtis knows all this about her and is very careful with her as a result." When Curtis is targeted by a local gang leader, Tony, he breaks up with Alice to protect her, as Tony threatens to kill her. When they later reunite, Alice is assaulted by Tony's girlfriend and admitted to the ED as a patient. She and Curtis become engaged; however, on their wedding day, Alice is taken hostage at gunpoint on the hospital roof. Curtis tackles her assailant over the edge, and dies saving Alice. The Daily Mirror's Jim Shelley criticized Alice's relationship with Curtis, deeming it "about as convincing as Stacey Slater's with Bradley, or Corrie's Maria and Tyrone", lacking in plausibility as: "Alice had gone from being so virginal and meek she was practically mute to marrying a youth the police claimed used to be 'a serious player'."

Alice began to take a 'back-seat' role following the conclusion to her relationship with Curtis, appearing in few scenes per episode with minimal lines. Following the death of Adam Trueman's (Tristan Gemmill) son, he went on a downward spiral and had a one-night stand with Alice. He rejected her the following morning, devastating her. Alice remained concerned about Adam and having been hurt by Adam too many times, she gets a new job and decides to leave Holby City Hospital. Adam's ex-wife Jessica Harrison (Gillian Kearney) meets Alice before her departure, where Adam discovers them.

==== Lily Chao ====
Lily Chao, played by Crystal Yu, is a registrar who first appeared on 3 August 2013. Lily had been through several years training from her arrival until August 2015. The BBC have described Lily as an intelligent, logical, high-achiever who comes from a hard-working family that like to boast about their doctor daughter, but have never really told her they are proud of her. In 2014, series producer Erika Hossington spoke to Digital Spy about a series of standalone episodes the show would produce, revealing that the first standalone would feature Lily, "The first one is a murder mystery and the character it features is Lily. That's been written by Jeff Povey. It's a great episode and it's all set at night. The hospital is empty, so it feels like a very ghostly place and that really feeds into the story that we're telling. It's brilliant and it feels very different."

==== Lofty Chiltern ====
Ben "Lofty" Chiltern, played by Lee Mead, made his first appearance in the series twenty-eight episode "The Last Chance Saloon", broadcast on 1 March 2014. The character was introduced to fill the "youngish male nurse" gap left by Jamie Collier following actor Daniel Anthony's decision to leave. Mead had previously appeared on the show in its twenty-sixth series as a patient and found it an honour to be invited back. Lofty was originally a staff nurse but was promoted to senior staff nurse in 2016. The character was specifically written for Mead, which helped the writing team when writing for the character. Mead opted to take a sabbatical from the show in 2015. On-screen, while the character was left running the ED, agency nurse Diane Stuart (Catherine Skinner) died and consequently, Lofty left Holby. The character departed in the series thirty episode "High Tide", broadcast on 12 March 2016. It was announced in February 2017 that the character would be reintroduced to Casualty's sister show, Holby City, working as a staff nurse on the fictional Keller ward.

==== Kirsty Clements ====
Kirsty Clements, portrayed by Lucy Gaskell, is a staff nurse who first appeared in the twenty-fourth series episode "Russian Endings", broadcast on 15 May 2010. Kirsty is billed as a brilliant nurse who provides "a breath of fresh air" and "a bucket full of attitude" to the ED. Her personalities helps her build friendships with her colleagues, notably Adam Trueman (Tristan Gemmill) who she shares a close bond with. Producers used the character to highlight the issue of domestic violence and introduced Kirsty's husband, Warren Clements (Stephen Lord), and daughter, Nita Clements (Holly Earl), for the storyline. Gaskell quit the role after a year of filming, with Kirsty's departure concluding her domestic abuse storyline. Producers decided to create a positive exit for the character and on-screen, Kirsty decides to leave Holby with Nita after she is motivated to create happier memories for herself. The character made her final appearance in the series 25 episode "When You're Smiling", broadcast on 30 July 2011.

==== Maggie Coldwell ====
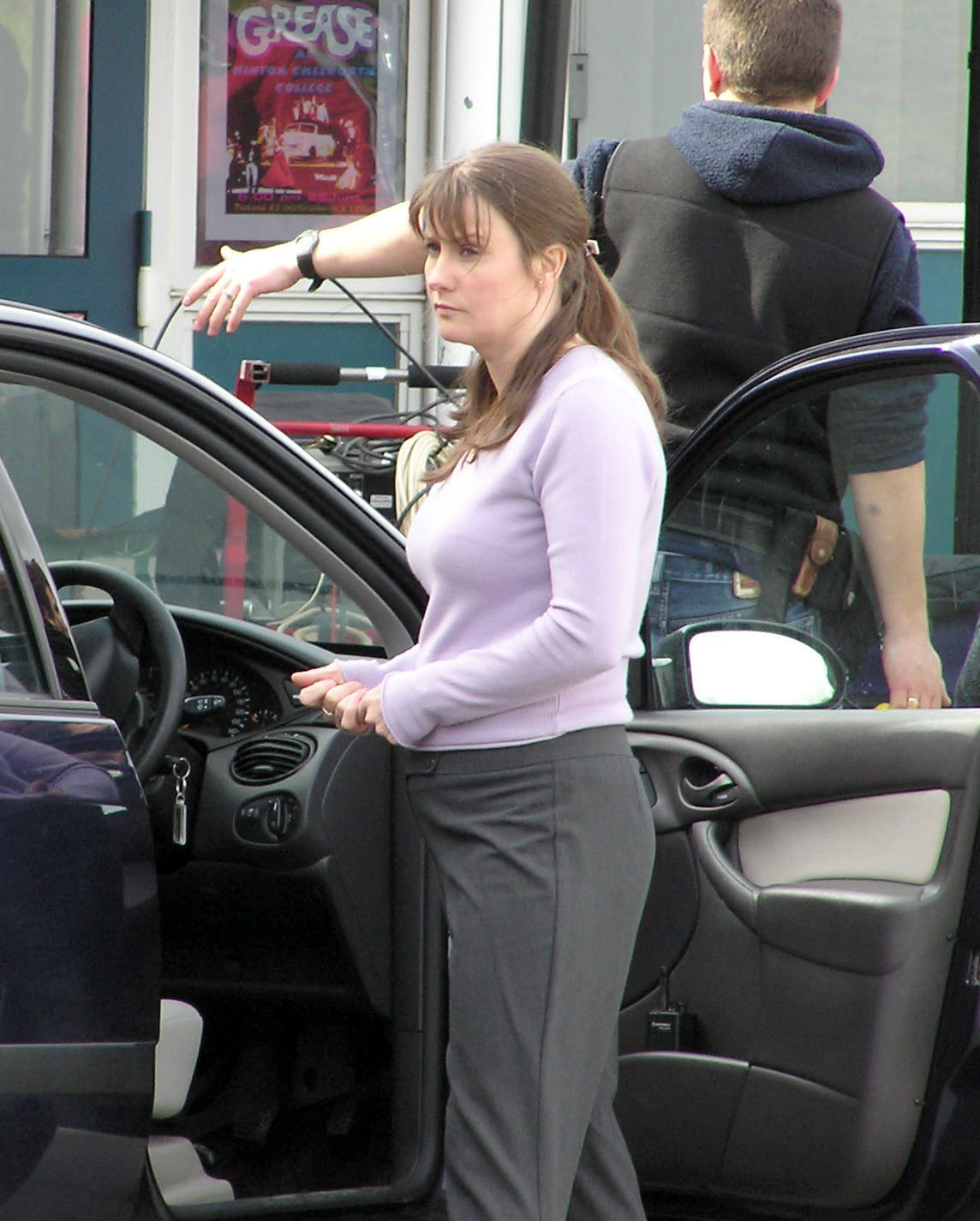
Actress Susan Cookson (pictured) as doctor Maggie Coldwell.

Maggie started off her career in medicine as a nurse, before retraining to become a doctor. She is highly competent, although has been held back from progressing further up the career ladder as a result of a tendency to be too outspoken with hospital management, most notably clashing frequently with Nathan Spencer. She successfully applied for the role of consultant, before Nathan claimed there was no funding to pay her post.

It was revealed that when her husband, Steve, had been sentenced to jail, she had told her children that he had died. When they discovered the truth and he was subsequently released, she allowed them to travel abroad with him to Malaysia. Paramedic Josh Griffiths was her lodger before his departure; however, she has a long running romantic interest in Josh's best friend Charlie Fairhead.

Maggie's daughter Joanne returned in January 2008, and Maggie was shocked to see that she was heavily pregnant. Maggie became a grandparent in February 2008, when Joanne gave birth to a baby girl called Lana. She now shares her house with Joanne, Lana, Toby and Ruth.

At the end of the 2008 series Maggie decided to leave Holby after the shock and stress of the coroners court, where she was framed by Marilyn. Maggie returned on 28 March 2009, in series 23 episode 31, for Kelsey Phillips' leaving party. She returned again for one episode in March 2015.

==== Jamie Collier ====
Jamie Collier, played by Daniel Anthony, made his debut appearance in the seventeenth episode of the twenty-seventh series, broadcast on 5 January 2013. Jamie was introduced as the nephew of Jeff Collier (Matt Bardock) and was created as one of four student nurses introduced to the show. A social media account was created for each character by the show and the four characters also featured in an online 'webisode' where they interviewed "each other about their final training placement and their fears of working in a busy Emergency Department" on their mobile phones. Anthony, Henderson, Devereux and Newman visited a real emergency department to prepare for the role where they were offered to observe "the majors or minors department". The BBC described Jamie as "sweet, charming, caring, warm and loyal". Jamie departed in the twenty-fourth episode of the twenty-eighth series, broadcast on 8 February 2014. The news had been announced by the show's executive producer Oliver Kent on 4 January 2014. Davood Ghadami, who guest starred as "gay Iranian asylum seeker" Ramin in 2013, was asked to reprise his role for Jamie's exit storyline. Kent commented that there was "a rather nice chemistry" between Jamie and Ramin and so the series chose to reintroduce the character for a "rather nice story." Anthony reprised his role in October 2014 for Bardock's exit from the series and returned in episode six of the twenty-ninth series, which broadcast on 11 October 2014.

==== Jeff Collier ====
Jeff Collier, played by Matt Bardock, is a paramedic who first appeared on 10 February 2007. It was announced on 30 June 2014 that Jeff would be leaving later in the year after seven years on the show. Jeff left after being killed in an accident, where he saves the life of Martin Ashford (Patrick Robinson), on 4 October 2014. This led to the exit of Tamzin Bayle (Gemma Atkinson), the permanent return of Iain Dean (Michael Stevenson) and the guest appearance of Jamie Collier (Daniel Anthony).

Jeff becomes good friends with Dixie upon his arrival, and when she is told budgetary constraints mean one of her team must be transferred, Jeff volunteers to go. He returns several months later, following the departure of Cyd Pyke. He discovers that fellow paramedic Snezana Lalovic (Ivana Bašić) is stealing hospital equipment to help illegal Serbian immigrants, and reluctantly agrees to keep it a secret when she swears not to do it again.

In November 2009, Jeff was struck on the back of the head by Alistair MacCormack (Joe McFadden), who believed that Polly Emmerson (Sophia Di Martino), who he delusively regarded as his "girlfriend", was seeing Jeff. Alistair also thought that Jeff had got a restraining order against him, but it was really Polly, who had reported Alistair to the police. Jeff was admitted to the ED.

During a call to a college shooting, Jeff witnesses the death of a student that leaves him with post-traumatic stress and threatened his job. He was told that would either need to return at work during the week or have to leave his job. He got some help and returned to work.

Jeff's wife, Lucy, leaves him after finding love with another man. He sees his children very infrequently. In between part 1 and part 2 of the Holby Riots, Dixie & Jeff were in a red button special, "The Kids Aren't Alright", which sees Dixie encourage Jeff to speak to his children again. In need of a lodger, Jeff searches for someone to move in and when Dixie's house is burnt down, she moves in with Jeff. Dixie asks Jeff to marry her, to make her father proud. Her father is unaware that she is a lesbian but catches her kissing another woman and has a heart attack.

In series 27, his nephew, Jamie Collier (Daniel Anthony), joins the E.D as a student nurse and Jeff's father, Billy, dies shortly after Jamie's arrival. Jeff is a support to Dixie when her partner, Carol, dies of a brain injury. He becomes concerned for Jamie when he decides to leave Holby for Australia with new lover, Ramin but eventually decides to let him go.

In series 28, Jeff is left stunned when past and former paramedic Tamzin Bayle (Gemma Atkinson) returns. Jeff later volunteers at an activity obstacle course. He meets event organiser, Samantha Keelman (Michelle Collins), helping her when she is admitted after slipping from a rope on a different obstacles. They agree to go out on a date, Samantha is revealed to be married and stabs her husband accidentally when he finds her and Jeff in bed. She attempts to blame Jeff but her lies are discovered and she is arrested by the police. Tamzin later reveals that she had called off her wedding.

When his colleagues, Connie Beauchamp (Amanda Mealing), Tess Bateman (Suzanne Packer), Martin Ashford (Patrick Robinson), Ethan Hardy (George Rainsford) and Lily Chao (Crystal Yu) are involved in a car crash, Jeff and Dixie arrive to help, successfully saving their colleagues. Meanwhile, Jeff tells his wife Dixie that he wants a divorce. In order to save Ash from bleeding out, he forcibly pulls out a piece of metal from his leg, allowing Dixie and the firemen to pull him out and carry him to the ambulance. Before Jeff can exit the vehicle, it explodes, killing him instantly as a horrified Ash and Dixie watch on.

Inside Soap described Jeff and Dixie as the 'dynamic duo'. In an interview with Inside Soap, producer Nikki Harris teased what was next for the two saying, "Dixie and Jeff were central to our opening episodes in Cardiff, as they really came under pressure with the car crash and the explosion that happened on the estate. And as we look at how the police interact with ED later on, the paramedics are going to be on the front line in terms of that, because they're sort of in between each side. So Jeff and Dixie are set to have key roles in those storylines when they play out on screen."

On 28 March 2014, it was announced Michelle Collins would join the cast as Samantha Keeler, the love interest of Jeff. It was revealed that as the romance with Jeff blossoms, a secret held by Samantha threatens to turn both of their worlds upside down. Casualty's executive producer Oliver Kent said: "We can't wait for everyone to meet Samantha and see where her story goes over the two months she's on screen. Michelle has been absolutely brilliant and her arrival is set to have a huge impact on one of the show's most loved characters."

On 30 June 2014, it was announced that Bardock would be leaving his role as Jeff after seven years in the role and that Jeff would depart on-screen in late 2014, after the conclusion of his new love interest storyline with Samantha Keeler. Executive producer, Oliver Kent spoke about Bardock's departure; "Matt Bardock has given us one of Casualty's all-time favourite characters and we are sad to see him go. Jeff Collier has been an iconic action hero for seven years and we have been so lucky to have had him on our team for so long. We wish him all the very best for the future." Bardock spoke about his exit from the programme on Twitter after receiving several messages from fans. He tweeted that he was overwhelmed with all the lovely comments and then thanked his fans for the 'love and support' for Jeff. He said it was a real 'gas' for seven years.

==== Leon Cook ====
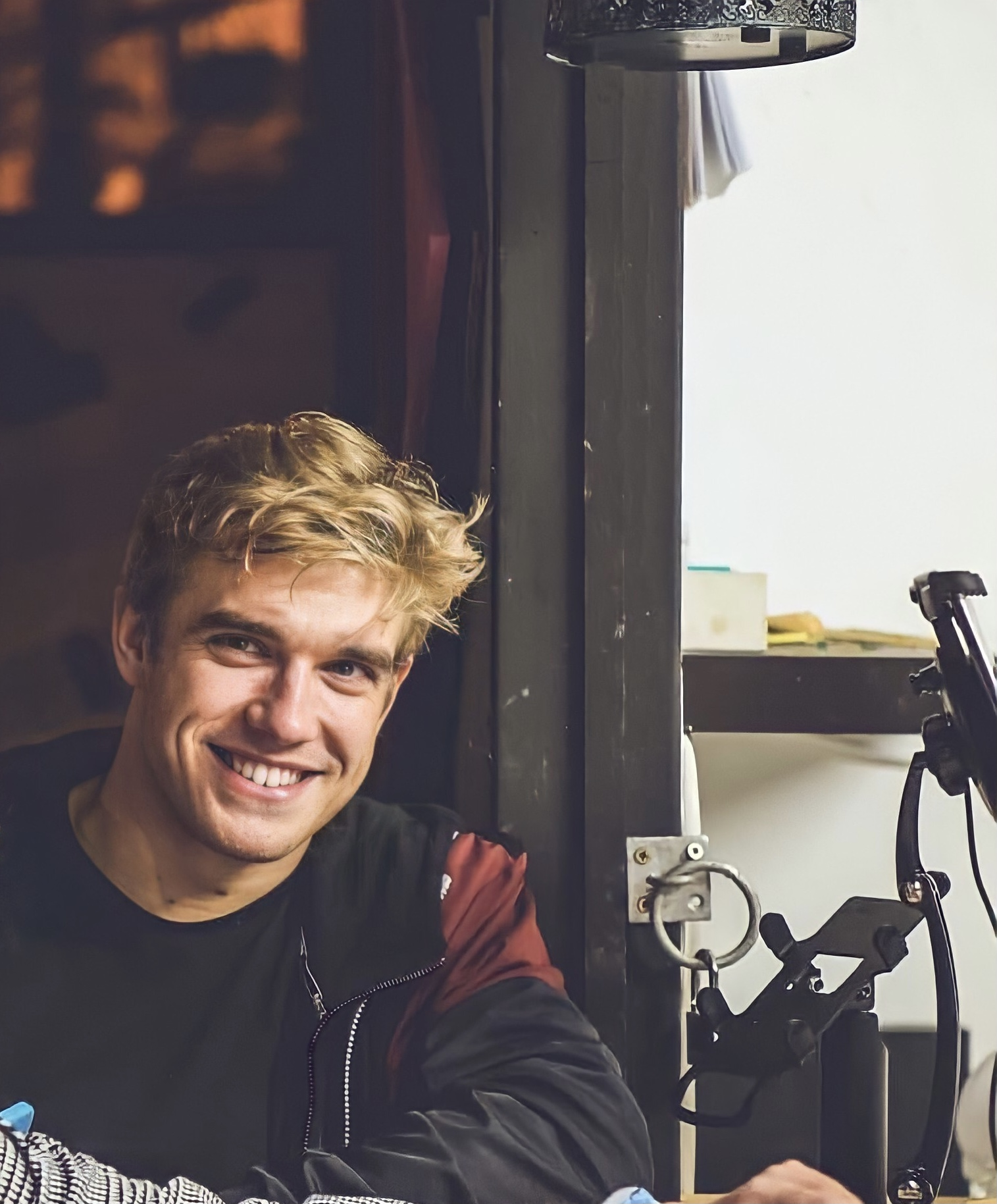
Bobby Lockwood portrays Leon Cook.

Leon Cook, portrayed by Bobby Lockwood, made his first appearance in the thirty-fifth series. The character and Lockwood's casting details were announced on 16 December 2020. Leon is billed as a "handsome, charming, loveable" but irritating paramedic. Leon often struggles to "read the room", but cares deeply about other people's opinion of him. His constant enthusiasm can often cause him to annoy his friends and colleagues. Loretta Preece, the show's series producer, described the character as "himbo", comedic and "a natural with the public". She said that the character would be developed through his "demanding and emotional" experiences in his job. She told Sophie Dainty of Digital Spy that he is not "the sharpest tool in the paramedic kit bag" and would test his boss Jan Jenning (Di Botcher). Lockwood expressed his delight at joining the show and representing paramedics during a pandemic. Preece also expressed her excitement at the actor's casting, praising his comic timing and the positive impact he has had on the cast and crew. She believed that the audience would respond positively to the character.

==== Curtis Cooper ====
Curtis Cooper, played by Abdul Salis, made his debut appearance in the twenty-seventh episode of the twenty-second series, broadcast on 1 March 2008. Curtis was introduced as the show's "handsome new technician" who was billed as a "baby-faced", "charming churchgoer" who is "a sweet man at first", with a "charming exterior" that covers "a time-bomb ticking away". He was teased to have a "secret past" that "comes back to haunt him". Curtis formed a relationship with Alice Chantrey (Sam Grey), which hit turmoil when Curtis' past was explored. Grey described Curtis as "a reformed bad boy" with "a past". Curtis departed at the end of the twenty-third series, broadcast on 1 August 2009. Curtis was killed off and died as a result of his injuries after falling from the hospital roof. The Daily Mirror's Jim Shelley criticized Alice's relationship with Curtis, deeming it "about as convincing as Stacey Slater's with Bradley, or Corrie's Maria and Tyrone", lacking in plausibility as: "Alice had gone from being so virginal and meek she was practically mute to marrying a youth the police claimed used to be 'a serious player'."

==== Scarlett Conway ====
Scarlett Conway, played by Madeleine Mantock, made her debut appearance in the series twenty-six episode "Starting Out", broadcast on 20 August 2011. The character and Mantock's casting was announced on 6 July 2011, alongside that of Lloyd Asike (Michael Obiora). Scarlett was billed as a "terrified ingénue", "tentative" and recently qualified staff nurse. Scarlett arrives for her first shift in the ED, but is "horror struck" after witnessing a patient go into cardiac arrest. She later manages to prove herself when an anxious teenager is admitted to the ED. Series producer Oliver Kent expressed his delight at Mantock joining the cast, calling her "an exciting new talent who is already proving herself alongside the more experienced heavy-hitters in the Casualty cast." He also described Mantock as "incredible". Casualty is Mantock's first role after graduating from drama school. Mantock left the series in 2012, having appeared on the show for eleven months. Scarlett departed at the conclusion of the twenty-sixth series, broadcast on 22 July 2012.

==== Max Cristie ====
Max Cristie, portrayed by Nigel Harman, made his debut appearance in the series thirty-seven episode "Crash Landing", broadcast on 18 February 2023. The character and Harman's casting was announced on The One Show on 7 February 2023, in a special segment around a new doctor joining the show. Max's storylines have included becoming the Acting Clinical Lead of the Emergency Department, being an old friend of established character Dylan Keogh, and trying to improve the Emergency Department amid budget cuts, and his estranged daughter, Jodie, arriving as a nurse in the Emergency department and having a kidney failure. In September 2023, Harman confirmed his exit from the role of Max, confirming that he had already filmed his final scenes, which were broadcast in March 2024, which shown the conclusion of his storyline around kidney failure, with his daughter, Jodie (Anna Chell), having donated one of her kidneys to him. After the transplant, he informs Dylan that he won't be returning to his role as a Consultant in the Emergency Department, and that he applied for a role with a medical organisation, and was offered a placement in South Sudan, which he chose to accept, leaving Holby and the Emergency Department behind.

=== D ===
==== Gemma Dean ====
Gemma "Gem" Dean, played by Rebecca Ryan, made her first appearance in "Little Sister", an episode in series 31. The sister of Iain Dean (Michael Stevenson), she is introduced when she recognises Iain while he is working as a paramedic. She goes to prison following a car accident, but is later released. Iain gets her a job as a barista in the hospital. At first, she refuses to fill in the application form for the job, and short-changes customers; it is then revealed that she cannot read or write. Gemma later secures a job as a porter. She is in a relationship with F1 junior doctor Rash Masum (Neet Mohan). but ends the relationship after she moves abroad.

==== Toby De Silva ====
Toby De Silva, portrayed by Matthew Needham, made his first appearance on 8 September 2007. Toby is a doctor who has just graduated from medical school. As an only child whose parents are in the medical profession, Toby was pushed into medicine.

On his first day on the show, we saw his lack of confidence which earned him the nickname Dracula. After making lots of mistakes and messing up an injection on a patient in front of his mother, Professor Camille Windsor, he decided to resign. Adam Trueman decided to give Toby another chance to prove himself by giving him a tricky procedure to do. After completing the procedure successfully, he decided to stay.

Since then Toby became more and more confident at his job and at Christmas 2007, he kissed Maggie under the mistletoe for a pound. She offered him her spare room, which he accepted, becoming her lodger. On 2 February 2008, Toby and Abs Denham found Ruth had hanged herself in her room. Toby found it hard to cope being the only F2 around and only just managed to complete a complicated procedure to save a girl's life.

After Ruth's attempted suicide, Toby got drunk at a pub with Maggie's pregnant daughter, Joanne. When she went into labour, he was forced to deliver the baby himself. The birth was successful and Toby and Joanne have since become lovers. Toby took a job in Orthopaedics with Sean Anderson as his boss. He was furious to discover Maggie had expressed serious doubts about his ability to do the job.

In November 2008, Toby discovered Ruth had spent the night with new Clinical Lead Nick Jordan and told her that Jordan was using her for a night of sex, not the whirlwind romance she believed was happening. She refused to believe him, saying that he was only saying that as he'd always fancied her. Later on, Toby went for a drink with new medical counsellor, Ben Harding, to discuss his feelings about Ruth but she found him in bed with Ben later that night which was the start of many problems to come.

Toby withdrew his statement and after arguing with Ben, embarrassed himself at the Christmas party with drink in hand. He threw away his NHS id badge but then realised he needed it to get his belongings back. He saw it and jumped into a boat, trying to retrieve it, but his foot went through the wood. He nearly drowned but luckily Toby was rescued and taken to casualty. He told his father that he was gay and told Mr Jordan that he wanted to quit immediately rather than serve his notice. This plan was derailed, following a rush of patients following a train crash, Mr Jordan said he could quit at the end of the shift. Only Toby was able to deal with a young girl who was refusing treatment. Saying goodbye to Ruth, he tricked her telling there was a spider on her head which made her close her eyes. He took the opportunity to kiss her on the cheek before leaving. As he walked through the ED he received hugs and smiles from his co-workers. Outside, due to Toby's father, Ben met him and they walked out of the ED carpark with promises of coffee.

Toby made a brief reappearance at the end of episode 3 of series 24 when he is seen to openly kiss the medical counsellor, Ben Harding and then they both head into the pub to join the rest of the team from the just-finished shift. He is welcomed with open arms by his ex-colleagues and offers some friendly advice to the new F2 doctors.

==== Iain Dean ====
Iain Dean, played by Michael Stevenson, first appears in the red-button special "Under Fire", credited as Corporal Dean. The character is introduced as a former Army colleague of Sam Nicholls (Charlotte Salt) whom she had an affair with in Afghanistan. Iain then appears in an episode of Casualty during the twenty-sixth series. Producers reintroduced the character in series 28 as a student paramedic working with Dixie Dixon (Jane Hazlegrove) and Jeff Collier (Matt Bardock). He was involved in a love triangle with Sam and her partner, Tom Kent (Oliver Coleman). Following her departure, Iain's backstory is explored and it is revealed that he has post-traumatic stress disorder (PTSD). Stevenson was pleased with the story. He becomes involved in a hostage situation involving a distressed Army colleague and his paramedic colleague, Big Mac (Charles Dale). This leads to the character's departure from the series. Series producer Erika Hossington announced in August 2014 that Iain would be reintroduced as a regular character, following Bardock's exit. She wanted to explore Iain and Dixie's partnership following the death of Jeff. He returns in early series 29 for Jeff's funeral, before accepting a paramedic position.

Stevenson appears as Iain in a crossover two-part episode with Casualty's spin-off series, Holby City, originally broadcast in March 2019. It was announced in May 2019 that Stevenson had concluded filming with the show and would leave the series for a break. The actor later revealed that it was not a break and a return had not been planned. Stevenson considered his decision for a while and wanted his character to leave at an appropriate point in his mental health story. He expressed his sadness and pride at leaving, but spoke of his pleasure at portraying Iain. He dubbed his experience at Casualty "unforgettable" and noted how he was proud of his character's mental health storyline. Simon Harper, the show's executive producer, praised Stevenson for his work on the show, particularly in the thirty-third series. He also stated that the character would be able to return. The character departs in early series 34 after joining the Helicopter Emergency Medical Service (HEMS) team. For the story, producers asked Hazlegrove to reprise her role as Dixie. Stevenson was thrilled with the decision and enjoyed spending his final episodes with the actress.

The character's return to the series was announced on 17 December 2020, via a promotional Christmas video. Stevenson expressed his excitement at returning and stated how he missed the show. He looked forward to exploring new stories for Iain. Iain returns in the fourteenth episode of Casualty's thirty-fifth series, originally broadcast on 10 April 2021.

==== Abs Denham ====
John "Abs" Denham, portrayed by James Redmond, made his first appearance on 4 October 2003. Redmond chose to leave the role in 2008, with Abs departing the show on 18 October 2008, after five years on-screen. It was announced on 16 August 2016 that Abs would guest appear in the show on 27 August 2016 for the show's thirtieth anniversary celebrations.

Abs' first day at work was particularly memorable. He discovered that an escaped psychiatric patient had stolen his identity and was posing as him within the Emergency Department. Although the impostor successfully fooled Clinical Nurse Manager Tess Bateman (Suzanne Packer), the matter was eventually sorted out and the genuine Abs was able to start doing his job.

Abs entered into a short lived marriage with Ellen Zitek (Georgina Bouzova), the half-sister of his love interest Nina Farr (Rebekah Gibbs). Ellen lied to him over the course of many months about the danger she faced in her home country, and Abs agreed to get married simply to help her get a visa. It eventually became clear, however, that Ellen's motives had not been genuine, and she was acting simply out of malice toward Nina. She left for a short period, during which Abs reunited with Nina – however, they were soon harassed by a loan shark to whom Ellen owed £15,000. Abs struggled to keep up with the payments, and not only got beaten up but had items repossessed. However, after being beaten up himself, the loan shark was fatally injured and Abs was free of Ellen's debt. Immigration officials also informed him that they would not be investigating his marriage to Ellen any longer, leaving him free to enjoy his time with Nina.

Once Ellen returned, Abs demanded a divorce. However, she soon revealed she had cancer, and although both Abs and Nina supported her throughout, several months later she was killed in an unrelated incident, run down by a motorbike, leaving Abs a widower. His relationship with Nina disintegrated during this period, with him first reacting poorly to the revelation she had once had relationships with women and identified as bisexual. He then became jealous of her relationship with Greg Fallon (Kip Gamblin), and eventually Nina decided to leave Holby.

In a special Comic Relief episode written by Richard Curtis, Abs was participating in a sleep-a-thon and was taken hostage by Megan Roach's (Brenda Fricker) grandson who crashed his camper van. Abs was unhurt but for a minor cut on his head. He was shot on New Year's Eve 2007 while out at a night club with Kelsey Phillips (Janine Mellor) but he escaped with just a minor injury to his arm. In protest of Charlie Fairhead's (Derek Thompson) hi i

==== Jack Diamond ====
Jack Diamond, played by Alistair Brammer, made his first appearance during the thirtieth series. Jack was a receptionist, who formed a friendship with receptionist Noel Garcia (Tony Marshall). The character was first previewed in the 2015 autumn trailer, which was released on 18 September 2015, where a receptionist character called Jack was revealed. Brammer's casting was announced by executive producer Oliver Kent in an interview with Radio Times, where he billed Jack as "flamboyant and outrageous and waspish". Brammer confirmed on Twitter that he was only contracted on the show for six months and he left after appearing in fifteen episodes.

==== Dixie Dixon ====
Kathleen "Dixie" Dixon, played by Jane Hazlegrove, is an Operational Duty Officer and Paramedic who first appeared on 30 September 2006. Dixie temporarily left the show on 3 May 2014, when she was given three-month suspension for taking a patient out of hospital without permission. She returned on 30 August 2014, at the beginning of series 29. On 5 May 2015, Dixie made a guest appearance in Holby City on the AAU ward, where she reunites with Adrian "Fletch" Fletcher (Alex Walkinshaw) and helps him with his ongoing issues. It was announced in January 2016 that Hazlegrove had left her role of Dixie after almost 10 years with her final scenes airing on 30 January 2016.

She first appeared as a paramedic having transferred from another hospital alongside close friend, Cyd Pyke. When senior paramedic Josh Griffiths takes a six-month sabbatical to travel the world, Dixie becomes Operational Duty Officer. She forges a friendship with new recruit, Jeff Collier, to whom she admits she is a lesbian. Believing Cyd's life is in danger, following a venomous snake bite, Dixie confesses her love for her friend. When Cyd recovers, their friendship is strained by this and she transfers to another hospital. In series 23, Dixie accidentally runs a girl over whilst driving the ambulance. Dixie requires counselling after the accident. The victim's family burn her house down in revenge, and she moves in with Jeff. Dixie asks Jeff to marry her, to make her father proud as he is unaware she is a lesbian. Her father, who is on his deathbed, catches Dixie kissing another woman and has a heart attack.

In between part 1 and part 2 of the final two episodes of Series 26, Dixie and Jeff were in a red button special, "The Kids Aren't Alright", which saw Dixie encourage Jeff to speak to his children again. In 2013, following the prison riots, Dixie becomes romantically involved with Carol Walcott, the prison officer. They begin a relationship but Dixie later finishes it. Weeks later, they reunite but Dixie doesn't want to tell Jeff. Dixie drops Carol off at a meeting and promises her that she will tell Jeff. While Carol is at the meeting, she falls and hurts her arm and head. She does not tell anyone she has hurt her head though. She gets treated and Zoe Hanna and Tess Bateman pick up on their romance. While being taken up to x-ray, Carol collapses, begins to slur words and vomit. She is revealed to have had a serious brain injury. Dixie tells Jeff about Carol and he tells her that he will always be there for her. Dixie then comes into the ED to find Carol and Zoe informs Dixie that Carol died on the way up to theatre. Dixie is full of grief and in shock. She locks herself in her office but confides in Rita Freeman (Chloe Howman) and later Jeff.

In April 2014, a patient is admitted to the ED after becoming involved in a motorbike crash. Dixie bonds with the patient, who is later revealed to be called Leo Wren, and helps him when he discovers that he could have his leg amputated. He later begins to recover slowly. Upon discovering his mother is dying, Dixie sets out on a mission to reunite them before her death, despite knowing the consequences for this. Max Walker helps Leo escape the hospital to the camper van Dixie has borrowed from a patient. Lofty Chiltern goes with Dixie & Leo to collect his mum, Scarlet (Amanda Ryan) from the place she is staying. Her carer initially insists she would like to stay in her room and she confirms this when she appears. Despite what she originally decided, Scarlet later decides to go to the beach with Leo, Dixie & Lofty. Her carer also comes with them and is constantly worrying about her but Dixie tells him to relax and enjoy the beach. Scarlet goes waterskiing and then enjoys herself on the beach with Leo. They share memories and he is left devastated when they have to return to the hospital. On their journey back to the hospital, Leo starts to suffer pain and upon their arrival in the hospital, he is straight away sent to resus. Meanwhile, Lofty is told off by Charlie Fairhead and Tess but is let off because he swapped his shifts with Robyn Miller. Dixie, however, is told by Zoe that she will be sanctioned for her actions. The following week, Dixie is seen discussing her upcoming meeting which decides her future as a paramedic with Jeff, Max, Louise Tyler, Noel Garcia & Big Mac. Big Mac later suggests they role play the meeting to which Jeff thinks is stupid but Dixie likes the idea and they go through with it. While on her way to the meeting, she spots someone in need of help after they fell onto a metal spike. She leaves for her meeting as soon as Jeff and Big Mac arrive and is very late. The ambulance trust suspend Dixie for three months and everyone says goodbye to her in the pub later on.

Dixie returned on 30 August 2014 in the middle of Jeff's struggles with his girlfriend, Samantha Keelman (Michelle Collins) after her husband discovered that they were seeing each other. Following Samantha's arrest and departure, Jeff asks Dixie for a divorce, which he intends to do after they return to the ED following a car crash involving Connie, Ash, Tess, Ethan and Lily. After saving Ash's life, the car explodes immediately killing Jeff as a horrified Dixie watches on helplessly. She returns to the ED alone and tells everyone of Jeff's fate. Tamzin begs Dixie to go and get Jeff but failed, before breaking down in her arms. Dixie and Iain's working relationship encounters some problems; the two fall out after Iain repeatedly puts himself in harms way to save patients, which following Jeff's accident, Dixie finds unacceptable. Meanwhile, she continues in her efforts to adopt a baby. Unfortunately, the adoption committee adjudged that she was still mourning Jeff and thus had emotional difficulties, and her application was refused.

Dixie's latest storyline began airing October 2015, which saw her meet paramedic Jess Cranham (Kerry Bennett) whilst taking part in a HART training course. However, a new dimension was added to the storyline when Jess was later found down the bottom off a deep hole in the middle of woodlands. Her partner, Nikki Chisom (Anna Acton) is present along with Jess's daughter, Olivia (Grace Doherty), at the time of the incident, causing Dixie to become concerned for the welfare and safety of Jess and Olivia. Dixie is later reported by Jess after interfering in their relationship. Hossington revealed that Dixie would play a major role in a domestic abuse storyline, which will climax on 9 January 2016 where events take a dark and potentially deadly turn.

Inside Soap described Dixie and Jeff as the 'dynamic duo'. In an interview with Inside Soap, producer Nikki Harris teased what was next for the two saying, "Dixie and Jeff were central to our opening episodes in Cardiff, as they really came under pressure with the car crash and the explosion that happened on the estate. And as we look at how the police interact with ED later on, the paramedics are going to be on the front line in terms of that, because they're sort of in between each side. So Jeff and Dixie are set to have key roles in those storylines when they play out on screen." In 2014, series producer Erika Hossington spoke to Digital Spy about the future plans for Dixie, saying that she and Jeff would be at the focus before his departure, "The other main characters we'll be focusing on over the next few months are Jeff and Dixie. I know the fans are really keen to know whether Dixie returns from her suspension before Jeff leaves, and I can confirm that she does – it would have been a huge letdown to the audience if she hadn't!" Hossington continued to say that following Jeff's departure that Dixie would establish a partnership with Iain, "It's going to be fun establishing Iain's partnership with Dixie, and especially seeing how Dixie copes with the change after she and Jeff were such a strong team."

==== Lisa "Duffy" Duffin ====
Lisa "Duffy" Duffin, played by Cathy Shipton, is one of the show's original characters and is a senior ward sister and senior midwife. Shipton revealed in 2016 that upon receiving the job, she was "flying about, doing the job, learning and lines and trying not to bump into the furniture". Shipton revealed that "in the early days" of appearing on the show, many young children would recognise her in the supermarket because of her portrayal of Duffy. She also stated that a nurse working on the show told her that she became a nurse because of her portrayal of the character. Shipton remained on the show until December 1993, but returned for a guest appearance in February 1998. She reprised her role permanently in September 1998, but left the role for the second time in April 2003. Shipton made various guest appearances from September 2006.

On 24 August 2015, it was announced that Shipton had reprised her role of Duffy, nine years following her previous appearance. Duffy returned as part of a two-part storyline written and directed by Casualty co-creator Paul Unwin in September 2015. Shipton said she was "proud to be playing Duffy again" because Duffy "seems to have a real and lasting connection with the public." The show celebrated its thousandth episode in June 2016, which saw Shipton return for a further guest appearance. Duffy's appearance saw her reveal that she had left her husband and was working in Holby as an agency nurse. It was announced on 7 June 2016 that following a "positive" response to her 2015 guest appearance, Shipton would be returning as a regular cast member in August 2016. Shipton said that being asked back to the show was "a no-brainer" and it is "very exciting" to be part of the show's team. Duffy's storylines included being raped, her relationship and later marriage to Andrew Bower (William Gaminara; Philip Bretherton), an affair with Max Gallagher (Robert Gwilym) and her long-standing enduring friendship with Charlie Fairhead (Derek Thompson), to whom she is married.

In August 2017, Shipton was longlisted for Best Drama Star at the Inside Soap Awards, while Charlie and Duffy's wedding was shortlisted for Best Drama Storyline. Duffy and Charlie's partnership was nominated for Best Soap Couple at the 2018 Digital Spy Reader Awards; they came in tenth place with 3.8% of the total votes.

==== Madiha Durrani ====
Madiha "Mads" Durrani, played by Hasina Haque, joined the cast of Casualty as a new nurse from Pakistan. She works in Resus and in CDU, has a very good friendship with Dr Yuki Reid. She made a New Year's resolution to make friends with all the staff; this soon ended in an uproar between Dr Winters and Staff Nurse Durrani. She was persuaded by Zoe to join the gang at the pub even though she is Muslim. 'Mads' has recently had feelings for Lenny and asked him on a date although she did not turn up. Lenny was disappointed but still continued flirting with her in the ED. As they are just about to kiss they get interrupted and later Mads leaves for her brother's wedding in Pakistan and Lenny is too late to wave her off. It is later revealed that she becomes engaged during the wedding.

In the episode on 21 May 2011, it is possible that she is kidnapped by a taxi driver after Lenny rejects 'Mads' outside a bar. When she was kidnapped, it was revealed a taxi driver either raped or attempted to rape her but later came to the hospital with wounds around his face. 'Mads' caused the wounds herself while trying to fight him off and that day, swore she would be loyal to her religion and wear the hijab (scarf) on her head. On the day, she wore her hijab for the first time, she met a woman that had brought in a patient. They soon became friends.

In one episode, her new friend had brought her daughter in as she was feeling sick. She treated her and saw her friend's husband, the taxi driver that tried to rape her. Lenny thinks that Ash should tell the police because he thinks that he was attacked and so Ash does. But when the police officer asks him what the attacker looked like, he said that it was a man. Mads then later tells Lenny about the attacker and how she got into that taxi outside the pub when Ash attacked her. Shocked, Lenny tries to console Mads when 2–3 days later an explosion at Holby Airport brings Mads and Ash face to face again. Ash was arrested for trying to flee the country on his brother's passport and assaulting Mads. Mads said that she was free and then takes her hijab (head scarf) off and says that just because she doesn't wear it doesn't mean she is not a Muslim and Lenny agrees. He then confesses his love for Mads, but she does not say anything. In series 26, she left to get married in Pakistan.

=== E ===
==== Polly Emmerson ====
Pauline "Polly" Emmerson, portrayed by actress Sophia Di Martino from 2009 to 2011, is an ambulance technician. She's described by the BBC as: "a superhero; she wants to save the world. The only problem is Polly is young, idealistic and needs to learn that the world is a complicated place and not everyone wants to be healed." Di Martino had previously appeared in supporting roles in both Casualty and spin-off Holby City. She auditioned three times for the part, and had to cease studying for her Master's degree in Applied Theatre when cast. She commented on her casting: "I feel very lucky to be joining such a long-running and well-established drama. I'm looking forward to Polly bursting onto screens, and hope viewers find her as much fun as I do." Series producer Oliver Kent added: "Sophia is a brilliant actress and we're very excited that she's joining us. We can't wait for the audience to see her – they're going to love her." Di Martino describes Polly as "very optimistic. She sees the best in everyone. She's fun, opinionated, brave and sometimes gets a little bit too close to her patients." After the suicide of homeless man Alistair MacCormack, who was infatuated with Polly, Polly was suspended while a full inquiry into his death was undertaken, after evidence given against her by Alistair's best friend, Abe, who believed that Polly should lose something that she really loved – her job – as revenge.

Polly, despite Abe's threat, keeps her job. It's revealed that she is in love with Jay and has a short fling with him. He quickly ends it, as he wishes to only be friends and because he still has feelings for Ruth. She leaves in series 25 to become a counsellor after admitting that she would rather be helping those with psychological problems rather than physical. On her last day at Holby, she is accidentally stabbed by a former patient, Hannah Fleet, and isn't found until a long time after. Despite Nick Jordan's best efforts to save her, the time of death is announced. It later emerged that Polly spent a lot of time trying to help and mentor Karl, a troubled local teenager.

=== F ===
==== Charlie Fairhead ====
Charlie Fairhead, played by Derek Thompson, is a senior charge nurse and the longest serving cast member of Casualty. He was the first character to appear on 6 September 1986, which was the first episode of the show, before making his first departure from the show in series 18, he later returned for thirty episodes in series 19 before making a permanent return in the following series. Thompson departed the programme in series 22, episode 17 before returning eleven episodes later. He has since remained in the show. Charlie has also appeared in occasional Holby City episodes from its debut in 1999 until 2012. He also appeared in an episode of HolbyBlue in 2007.

==== Jay Faldren ====
Jamshid "Jay" Faldren, portrayed by actor Ben Turner, first appeared on 25 October 2008 as a staff nurse. In his time on the show, Jay was involved in a relationship with Ruth Winters (Georgia Taylor) and developing testicular cancer. Turner and Taylor left their roles in October 2011 and on 10 December 2011, following the revelation that Ruth was pregnant and being involved in the blaze that ripped through the ED, they left Holby to begin a new life. Executive producer Oliver Kent revealed that Turner had filmed scenes to appear in the feature-length special celebrating thirty years of Casualty, "Too Old for This Shift", which airs on 27 August 2016.

Jay was described by the BBC as "a young Charlie Fairhead", that, "despite being a "prankster" and a "restless soul", was a brilliant nurse. Potentially, one of the best to ever step through the doors of ED." Jay believes he is "God's gift to women" and has three rules of romance: "never lie, never make a promise you can't keep, and always stay for breakfast." However, Jay then falls for doctor Ruth Winters, and "everything change[s]".

Turner had previously guest-starred in Casualty as a male rape victim, and believes that this role aided his casting as Jay, explaining: "They sort of had me in mind and because the last story I did on Casualty was quite strong in terms of storyline, they really liked it and when I auditioned they were in full praise of that previous episode." He visited a real hospital as research for the role, to gain an understanding of what the job is like for real-life medical staff.

Jay began a relationship with Ruth Winters, after meeting her alone at a bar in "True Lies". Although rejected, the doctor later asks him to be her "plus one" to the surgeons dinners. He accepted and they attended together, which made them become closer, and eventually starting a relationship. In series 24, they continued in their relationship, though kept it secret until episode five "Not Forgotten" in which Jay grew annoyed and gave her an ultimatum. She decided to go public with a kiss in front of her colleagues. Their relationship then ended when Ruth took an abortion pill behind his back. They got back together in the Christmas episode "Tidings Of Comfort and Joy" but quickly ended once more when Ruth came clean to Jay and told him that it was really an abortion and not a miscarriage. Episode 42 "Die and Let Live" saw Jay through one of his worst days, as he is told that the drugs trial he was part of for money could have landed him with the "crypto virus". The moment the blood test results put his mind at ease, however, Nick Jordan delivers the bombshell that Ruth was marrying that very day. He ran through the streets of Holby to plead his undying love to her, but was too late, as she was already married. Single at the start of series 25. Ruth tells Jay that she is leaving the ED, so when Jeff tells Jay in episode three that Polly likes him, he kisses her. They started a relationship in episode eight although Polly claimed that they had already been in a "relationship" for a "couple of months". His nan, Maryam Shakiba, played by Souad Faress, appeared in series 25, episode ten "Hands On" in which she believes Jay is a doctor, so he manages to persuade Ruth to perform a job swap.

==== Greg Fallon ====
Greg Fallon, portrayed by Kip Gamblin, first appears in the twentieth series episode "Abide With Me", broadcast on 10 June 2006. Australian actor Gamblin was cast in the show after relocating from Sydney. The casting process lasted ten weeks. He joined the drama during its twentieth anniversary celebrations and was excited by the prospect. Greg is introduced as a paramedic and to prepare for the role, he shadowed real paramedics for the day. Gamblin described his character as a "mad surfer" who enjoyed the outdoors, which he felt that he could relate to. Writers created a secret backstory for Greg and devised a love interest in colleague Cyd Pyke (Joanne King). Reflecting on his memorable stories, Gamblin named his first episode – where his character is involved in a stunt with a horse – and a comedic story about kung fu involving Greg, Abs Denham (James Redmond) and Nina Farr (Rebekah Gibbs).

==== Ryan Firth ====
Ryan Firth, portrayed by Eddie-Joe Robinson, made his debut appearance in the series thirty-seven episode "Welcome to the Warzone", broadcast on 8 April 2023. The character and Robinson's casting was confirmed alongside a new cohort of nurses being introduced to the programme on 23 March 2023. Robinson made an unannounced departure from the role in January 2024.

==== Adrian "Fletch" Fletcher ====
Adrian "Fletch" Fletcher, played by Alex Walkinshaw, first appeared on 7 July 2012, in the role of a staff nurse. Fletch later went on to become a senior staff nurse. His storylines have included an affair with Tess Bateman (Suzanne Packer), the subsequent break up of his marriage to Natalie Fletcher (Claire Cage) and financial issues following a gambling spree. On 1 April 2014, it was announced that Walkinshaw had left the show and that he would be reprising the role in the show's spin-off series, Holby City. He departed Casualty on 29 June 2014, after following the conclusion of his affair storyline with Tess and arrived in Holby City in August 2014. On 28 June 2016, it was announced that Walkinshaw would make a guest appearance in Casualty to celebrate its thirtieth anniversary. Fletch appears on 27 August 2016 in the premiere of series 31.

==== Rita Freeman ====
Rita Freeman, played by Chloe Howman, first appears in the twenty-eighth series episode "Once There Was a Way Home – Part One", first broadcast on 10 August 2013. The character and Howman's casting details were announced on 6 August 2013. Rita is introduced as a staff nurse. Howman described the character as sympathetic, good with patients, fiery, candid and fun to be around. After three years in the role, Howman departed the show. The character departs in the series 30 episode "The Fear", first broadcast on 16 July 2016.

=== G ===
==== Max Gallagher ====
Max Gallagher is a fictional character from the BBC medical drama Casualty, portrayed by actor Robert Gwilym. He appeared in the show from the first episode of its thirteenth series, broadcast on 5 September 1998, until series sixteen, episode 36, broadcast on 18 May 2002. His storylines involve dealing with his son, Frank (Tobias Menzies), who is a heroin addict and is murdered in series 14, and being suspended for supplying his partner's son with methadone, as a result of which he is ultimately forced to resign.

==== Noel Garcia ====
Noel Garcia, played by Tony Marshall, was a receptionist who first appeared on 5 January 2008. His storylines have included discovering his father had serious dementia, and friendships with Big Mac (Charles Dale) and Louise Tyler (Azuka Oforka). Noel lives with Big Mac, who is also his best friend. The BBC described him as "the practical joker of the bunch".

In series 27, Louise is introduced as another receptionist to help Noel, who tries befriending Louise to no avail. After Louise and Robyn Miller (Amanda Henderson) help Noel when he is made homeless, Louise and Noel become friends. Noel befriends the new porter, Max Walker (Jamie Davis). Noel and Louise support Big Mac after he is held hostage by Iain Dean's (Michael Stevenson) unstable army colleague, Kenny.

In August 2014, series producer Erika Hossington confirmed that Noel would be involved in a new storyline with Honey Wright (Chelsee Healey). She looked forward to the story as Noel had not been a focal point for "a long time". In the story, Honey reveals that she is Noel's daughter. Noel confides in Big Mac that he is not prepared to be a father, but builds a relationship with Honey. He is upset when Honey leaves, but delighted when she returns for a couple of months. Noel is later placed at the centre of a mugging, where he is attacked by Mercedes Christie (Hannah Spearritt).

Marshall appeared in Casualty's spin-off series, Holby City, in March 2017 as part of Dominic Copeland's (David Ames) domestic abuse storyline. He informs Dom that his boyfriend, Isaac Mayfield (Marc Elliott), has been having sex with other men. Marshall appears again as Noel in a crossover two-part episode with Holby City, originally broadcast in March 2019.

Noel died of COVID-19 in the first episode of series 35, broadcast on 2 January 2021, after producers incorporated the real-world pandemic into the series narrative. He is the first soap character in the UK to die from COVID-19. Marshall reprised the role months later for the show's thirty-fifth anniversary episodes, set in 2016. The actor found his return to set "strange [...] but rewarding at the same time" and was pleased to explore "yet another important subject".

==== Elle Gardner ====
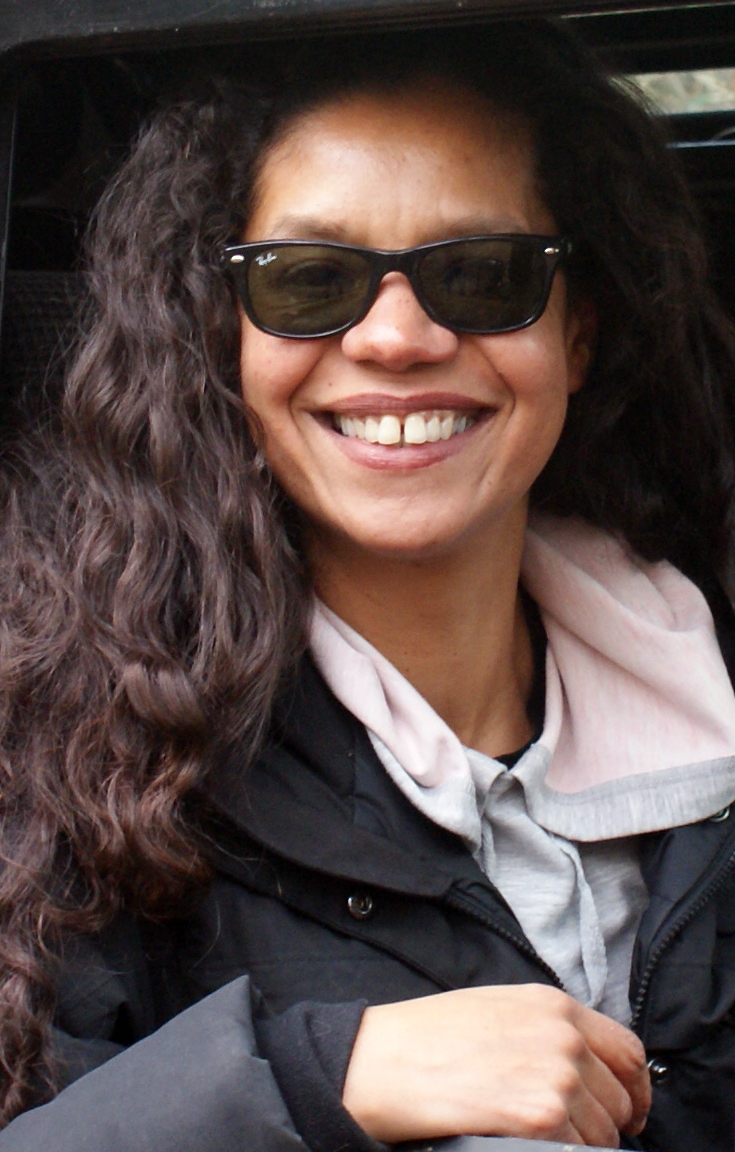
Jaye Griffiths joined the cast as consultant Elle Gardner in 2016.

Elle Gardner, played by Jaye Griffiths, made her first screen appearance on 7 May 2016. The character and Gardner's casting was announced on 24 February 2016, alongside those of Jez Andrews (Lloyd Everitt) and David Hide (Jason Durr). Executive producer Oliver Kent described the three castings as "wonderful" and said their storylines would be "brilliantly vibrant, bold and gripping". Elle is characterised as a consultant who "struggles to juggle" her "chaotic" family with the "pressures" of her job as a consultant. She is billed as "a little out of practise", but when she uses her instincts, she acts "brilliantly", which wins her colleagues over. Griffiths said it was "great" to return to Cardiff, having filmed in the city for her 2015 role in Doctor Who. She went on to describe the cast and crew as "extremely welcoming" and promised "powerful storylines" for Elle. Griffiths appears as Elle in a crossover two-part episode with Casualty's spin-off series, Holby City, originally broadcast in March 2019. On 4 May 2019, it was announced that Griffiths had left her role after three years in the role, and Elle would depart in the coming weeks.

On her first day, she ran over Vince Callaghan (Andrew Knott) and then alongside Zoe Hanna (Sunetra Sarker), treated Vince after being taken hostage and beaten up by Shelle Jones (Kelli Hollis). Elle also has a close relationship with Henrik, the hospital's CEO, and he also asks her to keep a close eye on the department and report anything negative. She also went to school with Jacob Masters (Charles Venn), but did not hit it off well with Connie Beauchamp (Amanda Mealing), Charlie Fairhead (Derek Thompson) or David. With Holby under intense media scrutiny, Elle finds some missing drugs in Charlie's locker and immediately reports them to Rita. Rita is obliged to inform Connie and Charlie is placed on immediate administrative leave, but since he is especially well-loved and trusted in the department Elle's decision draws the ire and mistrust of the whole staff, including even Jacob. She realises she has to work hard to regain their trust; in Casualty's 1000th episode, Elle does everything to save a pregnant woman who is reluctant to receive treatment having experienced a miscarriage. Her efforts are sadly in vain and the mother is lost, but afterwards several members of the team come to comfort her and accept her apologies. CEO Henrik Hanssen later promotes her to clinical lead.

After already drawing her ire by taking over her job, Elle finds herself relentlessly targeted by Connie after she discovers that Elle made a judgement call on the day of the helicopter accident that may well have worsened her daughter Grace's condition. Connie accuses her of incompetence, intimidates her and extracts complaints from patients, leading to a formal hearing. Grace sustains a serious neck injury at the hearing after excusing herself to the bathroom and smashing a mirror after seeing her reflection. Elle is first on the scene and reacts quickly to minimise the damage before paramedics arrive. When the hearing proceeds, Connie acknowledges her actions had been a result of grief and the charges against Elle are lifted. Elle herself feels unsuited to the role of Clinical Lead and wishes to focus on patients, so she tells Connie she can have her old job back.

Elle is furious at her son Kalen when she believes he has brought a girl back to their house, believing him to be too young to be having sex and adding that it sets a bad example for his brothers. She later finds out that Kalen actually slept with Jez after he hands her his ID at the hospital. She confronts Jez in the ED, angry that he has slept with her son. Although blindsided by her Kalen's coming out, she is supportive and reconciles with Jez, jokingly telling him to use the front door next time he wants to stay over rather than climbing the drainpipe.

==== Theodore "Teddy" Gowan ====
Theodore "Teddy" Gowan, portrayed by Milo Clarke, first appears in the thirty-sixth series episode "Begin Again", broadcast on 14 August 2021. The character and Clarke's casting details were announced on 10 August 2021. Teddy is billed as an "enthusiastic" and kind paramedic who is "truly committed to going the extra mile". He is also the nephew of established character Jan Jenning (Di Botcher), who becomes his boss. The character's introduction follows the departures of two paramedics, who were killed-off in the previous series. Teddy's eagerness contrasts the sombre mood of the ED and writers used this to create tension between him and Jan, who is still grieving for her friends. Writers devised friendships for Teddy with other characters, but also created conflict with nurse Charlie Fairhead (Derek Thompson). Clarke expressed his excitement at joining the cast and hoped the audience would like his character's "charm and zest". He was proud to represent the NHS through his portrayal of a paramedic.

==== Sebastian Grayling ====
Sebastian "Seb" Grayling, played by Rik Makarem, made his first appearance on 29 October 2016. Makarem's casting was announced on 31 August 2016, after he was seen in the show's Autumn trailer. Sebastian is a new F1 doctor, who will clash with Dylan Keogh (William Beck). Dylan initially offers to be Sebastian's placement mentor, but the pair do not get off to a good start when Sebastian almost hits Dylan's dog with his bike.

Seb's father, Archie Grayling, makes frequent visits to the ED as a surgical consultant. The father and son have a negative relationship; Seb is easily frustrated as his father walks in on him treating patients and criticises his work. Dylan, himself having been bullied by his own father, notices this and supports Seb. Dylan is strict and demands precision, consistency and assertiveness, but he is fair, and Seb tries hard to earn his respect. While treating a woman for a fall, her friend falls ill due to talking too much aspirin and dies, despite Seb's attempts to save her life. Seb blames himself, but Dylan assures him he did everything right and there was nothing more he could have done. Seb then gets drunk at the staff Christmas party and tracks Dylan down in his houseboat. He makes a move on Dylan, who rejects his advances. The next day, Seb tries to apologise, and they agree to continue as normal. While treating a young boy, Seb fails to check his abdomen which leads to complications; Dylan tells him that further inconsistencies will force him to fail Seb. Seb is hurt and angry and tells Elle that Dylan tried to kiss him on the houseboat instead of the other way around.

Seb composes a formal complaint about Dylan and tells the same lie to Louise, who gossips to the rest of the staff. They are unconvinced until they see a photo Max accidentally took of a shirtless Seb hugging Dylan. Elle is concerned once she sees the photo and shows Dylan. In front of the rest of the staff, Dylan confronts Seb. Seb repeats his claim that Dylan tried to kiss him. Dylan insults Seb over his insecurity and inexperience, ending up looking like the guilty one, leaving Elle no choice but to open a formal investigation. The next day, Seb has a patient in resus suddenly aggravate an injury and lose his pulse, which makes Seb freeze up completely. Dylan is looking on and has been asked to keep his distance, but instead he steps in and shakes Seb out of his panic, monitoring him through the cardiac massage and saving his patient. Seb rescinds his complaint and Dylan recommends him for a place at another hospital, believing Seb would benefit from being separated from his father.

=== H ===
==== Zoe Hanna ====
Zoe Hanna is played by Sunetra Sarker and first appeared on 29 December 2007. Zoe was initially a consultant in emergency medicine, but was promoted to a senior consultant in 2011. Zoe was made acting clinical lead in 2008, following the departure of Harry Harper, but the role is later given to Adam Trueman. Zoe was promoted to trauma lead in 2010 and when Nick Jordan went on leave in July 2012, she was made acting clinical lead. This was made a permanent role when Nick left in February 2013. Zoe began a relationship with the new porter Max soon after Max started as the hospital porter. Zoe stood down from Clinical Lead in June 2014 giving the role to Connie Beauchamp (Amanda Mealing), and at the end of series 28 she handed in her resignation. She returned on 25 October 2014 along with Dylan Keogh. Soon after her return, she rekindled her romance with Max and he proposed to her. She was initially skeptical as she didn't think that she could give him what he wanted, as she couldn't have children, but he persuaded her that he wanted to marry her and they got engaged. On the night before their wedding she slept with another man who she had met during her hen party. She didn't tell Max until after the wedding, even giving him the man's watch which had been left on her bedside table to cover up her mistake. After marrying Max, Zoe has no choice but to admit her mistake to Max. Afterwards she flees onto Dylan's boathouse. However, an explosion on the boathouse throws Zoe into the lake. She survives and back at the hospital kisses him and tells him she still loves him. He ends their relationship and later, in the pub, asks for a divorce. They remain separated to this day but continue to be "friends".

==== Ethan Hardy ====
Ethan Hardy, played by George Rainsford, first appeared on 11 January 2014 as a specialist registrar of Holby City Hospital.

Ethan and his brother, Caleb, were introduced alongside each other. The brothers and their castings were announced on 4 September 2013. It was announced that former Call the Midwife star, George Rainsford and that Richard Winsor would be playing Caleb. The BBC said of Ethan and Caleb, "He is studious witty whizz kid, who is the total opposite to his, pure adrenaline junkie, brother and both characters will have a big impact on the emergency department." Casualty's executive producer, Oliver Kent, said: "The arrival of Ethan and Caleb will instantly change the dynamic of the ED. Whilst very different characters, one thing they will have in common is an ability to charm, so expect sparks to fly. We can't wait to start filming and are thrilled to have George and Richard join the team." Rainsford appeared in an episode of Holby City as Ethan in June 2016.

==== Harry Harper ====
Harry Harper, played by Simon MacCorkindale, first appeared on 8 June 2002, in the role of the emergency department's clinical lead and a consultant in emergency medicine. Harry's storylines have included developing an anti-depressant dependency, relationships with Ellen Zitek (Georgina Bouzova) who later dies and Selena Donovan (Liz Carling), beginning a new career as a member of parliament and returning to the department. MacCorkindale took a six-month hiatus from the show during 2007, with Harry departing in February and returning in August. When he learned he had terminal lung cancer, MacCorkindale chose to leave the series permanently. He returned from his hiatus to film his final scenes and his final appearance was in the series twenty-two episode ""To Serve and Protect"", broadcast on 8 March 2008.

==== Jessica Harrison ====
Jessica Harrison, played by actress Gillian Kearney, arrives in Casualty as an agency nurse but later becomes a Staff Nurse.

She had a one-night stand with Adam the night before her first shift and is shocked to realise that she will be working with him. They discuss having a relationship and she isn't keen but they eventually begin an affair, despite Jessica being married to Orthopaedic Consultant Sean Anderson and they have two children, Amelia and Lucas. Jessica ends the affair, feeling guilty that Lucas was injured while she was with Adam. She is shocked to discover Sean is having an affair too – with Zoe Hanna, and that she's expecting her third child. Unsure who is the father, she assumes it is Sean's, only telling Adam when she is admitted to the ED, following an accident at home. Unfortunately Sean guessed he might not be the baby's father on seeing Adam's reaction to Jessica's news. Devastated, he took Amelia and Lucas to Saudi Arabia for his new job as planned and told Jessica that she could only join them after she'd had an abortion but Jessica refuses, moving into a flat on the Farmead Estate after being evicted from the marital home.

Shortly after Harry's birth, he is rushed to the ED with breathing difficulties. Worried he might not live, Jessica tells Adam that he could be Harry's father and they reunite, naming their son Harry Adam Trueman. Desperate to see her other children, Jessica lies to Sean and his mother, Maureen, that Harry is Sean's son and receives her passport and a ticket to Saudi Arabia, as she knew he would. Despite Adam's anger, she takes Harry to Saudi Arabia but promises that they will return. Two weeks later, she returns with all three children.

Adam is initially furious but on calming down, asks her to divorce Sean, marry him and have a DNA test that confirms Adam is Harry's father. Jessica is furious with Adam when he calls Sean regarding Amelia and Lucas but agrees he can have access. She and Adam forgave each other and they decide to move in together and get engaged, planning to marry at the New Year. However, Jessica and Adam were not pleased to see Sean return to work at Holby City Hospital but accepted it. Sean tries making peace, realising he has behaved badly. Adam agrees to a fresh start but Jessica isn't as forgiving. Sean, however, has not given up hope of winning her back but is shocked by how much watching her with Adam and the children hurts.

On their wedding day, Adam is called back to the ED, following a minibus crash. They married in the hospital chapel and were returning to the venue to sign the papers but crashed en route. Adam's car sank into a lake with him, Jessica and Harry inside. All 3 were pulled from the water alive but Harry died. After 2 weeks in a coma, Jessica wakes up. However, she and Adam drift apart, and, feeling that she cannot stay with him and the memory of Harry, she and the children go to America with an old friend. Jessica returns to Holby at the end of "New Beginnings" after Alice calls her, worried about Adam's mental health. Initially Adam is hostile to her but after being sealed in the ED, worried about a possible anthrax scare, they reconcile. Back at Adam's house, Jessica seems happy to stay until she finds Harry's feeding spoon in a kitchen drawer. Unable to take any more, Adam insists Jessica make a decision about staying or leaving there and then.

In 2016, Kearney described filming the scenes in which Adam and Jessica's car submerged into a frozen lake as "the biggest thing" she has been involved in. She recalled that she had a "fear of water beforehand", before stating how "exciting" filming the scenes was because "it's so big budget and it's weird to see".

==== David Hide ====
David Hide, played by Jason Durr, made his first screen appearance on 30 April 2016 as a staff nurse. The character and Durr's casting was announced on 24 February 2016, alongside those of Jez Andrews (Lloyd Everitt) and Elle Gardner (Jaye Griffiths). Executive producer Oliver Kent described the three castings as "wonderful" and said their storylines would be "brilliantly vibrant, bold and gripping". David is characterised as a "shy, withdrawn, and socially awkward" nurse. He was billed as someone who "goes about their work efficiently and quietly", with another side to his personality that would "love to be able to unleashed", but comes "at a price". Durr said he felt "delighted and thrilled" to be joining the "iconic" show in its thirtieth year, and described David as "intriguing". Durr confessed that despite being in a medical drama, he had "a huge phobia of needles and blood" and was hoping his new role would overcome his "life long fear". Durr's wife revealed through Twitter that he had begun filming on 14 January 2016. In the build up to the announcement of his casting, Durr had been tweeting various pictures linking to hospitals including a nurse uniform and an ambulance. Durr appears as David in a crossover two-part episode with Casualty's spin-off series, Holby City, originally broadcast in March 2019.

David was characterised as a "shy, thoughtful and withdrawn man who struggles with the social complexities of the world" by the BBC website. They described him as "a good and diligent nurse, who follows instructions well and goes about his job efficiently and quietly." They concluded that David would "love to be different" and "unleash the bold, confident side of his personality", but he is "too afraid of the consequences". Sarah Ellis of Inside Soap described David as "an oddball" with "a troubled past". David's family was introduced in September 2016, with Harry Collett and Lorraine Pilkington cast as David's son, Ollie, and former wife, Rosa, respectively. In an interview with Ellis, Durr described David's relationship with Ollie as "wonderful", adding that he "loves him more than anything else in the world". He explained that there has been distractions in David's life which have prevented him from seeing "as much as Ollie as he wants to." David's absence from Ollie's life have created issues, which Durr said needed to "be dealt with". Rosa disapproved of David and Ollie's relationship due to her dislike of David's past behaviour, which she revealed in the middle of the ED. Durr believed that David did not "feel great" about Rosa's outburst, but said that David "strives to deal with it" and "tries to be positive". Durr, Collett and Pilkington filmed a stunt which saw Ollie left trapped in a car engulfed in flames and Hide described the scenes as "a joy to do" because it forces David "to step up, which is difficult for him".

During his first shift, David managed to impress consultants Connie Beauchamp and Dylan Keogh (Amanda Mealing and William Beck), despite having previously concerned Dylan by his lack of speech. David dislikes people calling him 'Dave' and is frustrated when consultant Elle Gardner repeatedly does this, but charge nurse Charlie Fairhead (Derek Thompson) reassures him that she is only messing with him. David worked with Robyn Miller (Amanda Henderson) on various patients and begins to warm to her and so, he is devastated when he overhears Robyn saying how hard he is to work with. They worked together and brought a couple together, leading them to create a mortality café. David baked a cake for the café and he and Robyn launched it in their local pub. Robyn met Glen Thomas (Owain Arthur) and David discovers that Glen had been lying about having a wife and confronted him where Glen was forced to admith the truth to Robyn. David comforted Robyn and was shocked when Glen was admitted to the ED with a stage 4 brain tumour that he didn't want to tell Robyn about. However, David informed Robyn and they reunited.

After suppressing his emotions for so long with his bipolar medication, David comes off them, so that he can live his life. He quickly becomes manic, hallucinating a psychiatrist and impulsively buying a sports car, before taking Robyn for a drive in it. She goes into labour and David proceeds to try to deliver her baby in a graveyard, at night, while it is raining. The birth does not go to plan and as a result, Robyn's baby has serious medical complications in her early life. David is taken to a psychiatric ward, and once released rejoins the ED staff. He fixes his friendship with Robyn and continues working in the ED alongside his co-workers who are now aware of the extent of his manic episodes.

==== Archie Hudson ====
Archie Hudson, portrayed by Genesis Lynea, made her first appearance in the thirty-third series, in an episode originally broadcast on 23 March 2019. The character and Lynea's casting details were first announced on 7 March 2019. Plans to introduce new doctors to the show were announced on 15 August 2018. Archie is billed as a "bold, bolshy and extremely confident" doctor who clashes with clinical lead Connie Beauchamp (Amanda Mealing). She is a specialty registrar in emergency medicine and begins a new job at the hospital's emergency department. Archie's backstory states that she was a whistleblower at her last hospital after her friend killed themselves as a result of "gross mismanagement". The character was introduced alongside registrar Will Noble (Jack Nolan), who was billed as not "fazed" by Archie's personality. Series producer Lucy Raffety dubbed the bond between Archie and Will as a "love-hate sibling-esque rivalry" and confirmed that although there would be no romantic feelings between the characters, they are "far more fond of each other than they'd let on".

Sue Haasler described the character as "blunt, outspoken and possibly a little over-confident" in an article for the Metro, but also observed that "underlying her hot-headedness is a real passion to make a difference". Sophie Dainty of Digital Spy thought the drama needed new characters and believed that Archie and Will could be "just what the doctor ordered". Elaine Reilly, reporting for What's on TV, liked Archie's introduction, calling it "action-packed", and opined that Lynea's "screen presence is stellar". She also noted that she was curious about the character's backstory.

==== Tariq Hussein ====
Tariq Hussein, portrayed by Manpreet Bachu, made his first appearance in the thirty-eighth series, in an episode originally broadcast on 23 February 2024. Tariq is the cousin of established character, Rash Masum (Neet Mohan). Bachu's casting was confirmed in February 2024 as part of a new cohort of doctors joining the medical drama.

=== J ===
==== Indie Jankowski ====
Indie Jankowski, portrayed by Naomi Wakszlak, made her first appearance on 24 December 2024. The character and Wakszlak's casting details were revealed by Digital Spy two days prior to her appearance airing. It was hinted by the website that in her initial scenes, Indie would be "getting off on the wrong foot" with Jan Jenning (Di Botcher), her trainer. However, determined to spend her third-year placement as a student paramedic at Holby, she asks Jan for a job. Indie's introduction marked the first time Casualty had had a student paramedic on the series. Of her casting, Wakszlak said: "It's a huge honour to work on BBC's Casualty and join the incredible cast and crew here in making one of the UK's best-loved series. I hope you'll all love Indie as much as I do!"

Executive producer Roxanne Harvey stated: "Naomi is an emerging talent who brings depth and authenticity to the role, seamlessly capturing Indie’s determination and drive to prove herself in a demanding environment. As Indie navigates her professional journey, viewers will witness her growth as a paramedic and the relationships she forms with colleagues, her boss Jan and patients."

In 2025, Wakszlak received a nomination in the "Soaps - Best New Casting" category the Digital Spy Reader Awards.

==== Jan Jenning ====
Jan Jenning, portrayed by Di Botcher, made her first appearance on 19 May 2018. The character and Botcher's casting details were first published in a TV Times' interview with Lucy Raffety. Jan is a paramedic and operational duty manager, who takes control of the Holby Ambulance Service. Sophie Dainty of Digital Spy billed Jan as "bold, brash and bossy", which makes her clash with her colleagues, especially paramedics Iain Dean (Michael Stevenson) and Sam Nicholls (Charlotte Salt). Raffety joked that Jan would "read them the riot act and whip them into shape". Despite her assertive personality, Jan always protects the people on her team. Her backstory states that she is already friends with nurse Lisa "Duffy" Duffin (Cathy Shipton). On the character, Dainty commented, "Give this one a go, she'll grow on you."

==== Comfort Jones ====
Comfort Jones, played by Martina Laird, made her first appearance in the sixteenth series episode "Holding the Baby", broadcast on 15 September 2001. Comfort is a paramedic. She was married to fellow paramedic Finlay "Fin" Newton (Kwame Kwei-Armah) until his death. During her time in the show, she battled alcoholism and depression. She was stabbed twice, suffered a miscarriage and discovered Fin was a bigamist. Laird decided to leave the show in 2006 and filmed her final scenes in July. Of her decision to leave, she stated "It was a tough decision but we're always happy to take up new challenges. I'm very lucky to have had the opportunity to work with such wonderful people and play such a great character for five years." The character departed in the twenty-first series episode "It's Now or Never" on 18 November 2006. Laird reprised her role for a guest appearance in the 30th anniversary episode "Too Old for This Shift".

=== K ===
==== Tom Kent ====
Tom Kent, played by Oliver Coleman, is a Paediatrician who first appears on 7 January 2012 and last appears on 14 December 2013.

On 30 September 2011, it was announced that Oliver Coleman was joining Casualty as Tom Kent, a new pediatrician. Coleman's casting was announced the same time as Sam Nicholls (Charlotte Salt) his now off screen wife. The BBC said, "Oliver (28) takes the role of pediatric specialist doctor Tom Kent. Gentle, calm and a brilliant children's doctor, Tom finds his maturity at work doesn't always carry over into his private life." Series producer Nikki Wilson said of his casting: "Charlotte and Oliver are incredibly talented, much sought-after actors and we're delighted to welcome them to the new Casualty set in Cardiff. Both new characters are set to inject a shot of excitement into the emergency department and, as ever, both will have an air of intrigue about them."

In 2012, Casualty producer Nikki Wilson teased the characters upcoming storylines and introduction to the show saying, "Tom's a bit of a commitment-phobe, and we're currently working on his storylines to get to the bottom of why that is – there are some very interesting ideas! Tom is bringing a great new energy to the team of doctors – he's a bit of a gentle giant and is great with kids. In fact, the way he connects with children is set to be a key feature in the stories in which he'll be involved."

Tom becomes romantically involved with Sam Nicholls in series 27, where the couple end up kissing after a night out in the pub. Over time, their relationship grows closer, and Tom announces that he wants a committed relationship with her after he gets jealous when another doctor asks her out. A speech exclaiming his feelings towards her and a kiss in the middle of the E.D convinces her that she really loves him. Tom then struggled through a drug addiction due to panic attacks, but Sam helped him through it and he promised to stop taking the drugs. After a short row where Tom hit Sam by accident, Sam forgave him and the two made up, leaving the series 27 finale with a kiss. The couple have returned to their 'happy-in-love' stage, and their relationship grows ever closer. In series 28, Tom decides he wants to propose to Sam but his proposal plan was ruined by Robyn and Iain. Sam hastily proposes to Tom herself, to which he accepts. Sam and Tom marry and leave Holby together for an 'extended honeymoon' and fresh start.

==== Dylan Keogh ====
Dylan Keogh, played by William Beck, made his first appearance on 12 March 2011. Dylan is a Consultant in emergency medicine. He was married to fellow doctor Sam Nicholls (Charlotte Salt) and developed a friendship with Zoe Hanna (Sunetra Sarker). Dylan departed in 2012. On 16 August 2014, it was announced that Casualty were reintroducing a character from the past, but they initially kept the identity of this character a secret. It was later revealed that Beck had reprised his role and Dylan returned on 25 October 2014.

==== Fenisha Khatri ====
Fenisha Khatri, portrayed by Olivia D'Lima, made her first appearance in the twenty-fifth episode of the thirty-fourth series, first broadcast on 22 February 2020. Initially introduced as a love interest for Ethan Hardy (George Rainsford), Sue Haasler of Metro described her as "spirited, enthusiastic and brave". She later makes a connection with Will Noble (Jack Nolan), and falls pregnant.

==== Bea Kinsella ====
Bea Kinsella, portrayed by Michelle Fox, made her first appearance in the twenty-second episode of the thirty-second series, first broadcast on 3 February 2018. Bea is a foundation doctor in her first year of training. The character was announced on 7 September 2017, while Fox's casting was revealed on 3 October. Bea is billed as "gutsy and ambitious". Producer Lucy Raffety described Bea as initially, confident, sassy and feisty although this changes as she develops as a character. Fox began filming in October 2017. The character's backstory states that Bea's mother left her with her alcoholic father at a young age. Despite his addication, Bea has continued to support her father. Bea also forms a friendship with Alicia Munroe (Chelsea Halfpenny). Advanced spoilers for episode 44 of series 32, first broadcast on 4 August 2018, revealed that Bea would depart in the episode. Fox confirmed her departure from the series on Twitter after the episode's broadcast.

==== Marty Kirkby ====
Marty Kirkby, portrayed by Shaheen Jafargholi, made his first appearance on 17 November 2018. On 1 August 2018, Sophie Dainty of Digital Spy reported that Jafargholi had joined the show's cast. Producer Lucy Raffety billed Marty as a nurse with a "razor sharp wit" who would quickly learn that being a nurse in the emergency department (ED) requires more than "a cheeky wink and a clever one-liner". Marty will soon realise that the ED is more challenging than originally believed. Jafargholi relocated to Cardiff, where the show is filmed, for the role. He expressed his delight at joining the cast, describing it as "a whirlwind few weeks". Raffety also said how happy she was with Jafargholi's casting, commenting, "We are delighted that Shaheen is joining the cast of Casualty. He is a huge talent with such a warm screen presence and we know he will bring so much to the show." Jafargholi appears as Marty in a crossover two-part episode with Casualty's spin-off series, Holby City, originally broadcast in March 2019. Holby City producer Jane Wallbank confirmed in August 2019 that Marty would appear in the show again for a story with Kian Madani (Ramin Karimloo), and he appeared in a series 22 episode, originally broadcast in January 2020.

==== Caleb Knight ====
Caleb "Cal" Knight, played by Richard Winsor, first appeared on 18 January 2014. Caleb and his brother, Ethan Hardy, were introduced alongside each other. The brothers and their castings were announced on 4 September 2013. It was announced that former Call the Midwife star, George Rainsford would play Ethan and that Richard Winsor would be playing Caleb. The BBC said of Caleb and Ethan, "He is a pure adrenaline junkie, who is the total opposite to his studious witty whizz kid brother and both characters will have a big impact on the emergency department." Casualty's executive producer, Oliver Kent, said: "The arrival of Ethan and Caleb will instantly change the dynamic of the ED. Whilst very different characters, one thing they will have in common is an ability to charm, so expect sparks to fly. We can't wait to start filming and are thrilled to have George and Richard join the team."

==== Jude Korcanik ====
Jude Korcanik, portrayed by Lisa Coleman, first appears in the ninth series episode "First Impressions", originally broadcast on 24 September 1994. Jude is a "straightforward, down-to-earth and compassionate" staff nurse. Her appearance consists of a dreadlocks hairstyle and multiple piercings. Coleman had her nose pierced for the role. Jude is an atheist and makes a point of not celebrating Christmas. Prior to joining Casualty, Coleman was squatting and living in housing cooperatives. She researched the NHS for the role and was shocked to learn about its struggles. The character was given a love interest in Matt Hawley (Jason Merrells) and following a one-night stand, Jude learns that she is pregnant. Coleman expected to receive a negative response from the story, but thought that she did not because the story promoted safe sex.

In 1997, Coleman quit the series after feeling worn down by the depressing stories on the show and at fear of being typecast. She told Emma Burns of the Daily Mirror that she was growing tired of the routine in her twelve-hour day filming for the show. Writers created a dramatic exit for the character and she is stabbed by a patient. The stabbing was made a cliffhanger and was watched by fourteen million viewers. After being found, medics fight to save her life in theatre. Jude recovers and in the following series, it is mentioned that she has married Matt in Crete. Jude departs in the eleventh series episode "Perfect Blue", originally broadcast on 22 February 1997, after appearing in ninety episodes. Fourteen million viewers watched Jude's stabbing and Burns thought it made "a harrowing end" to the character's tenure. In September 1998, Coleman was asked about a return to Casualty and did not rule out the possibility.

=== L ===
==== Matty Linlaker ====
Matthew 'Matty' Linlaker, played by Aron Julius, made his first appearance on 10 January 2026. He joins the emergency department as a resident doctor on rotation and is introduced alongside Kim Chang (Jasmine Bayes), who he went to university with. Matty is shown to be a "full of that, 'I'm ready to take on the world' energy" character who is eager to prove himself and loves competition. However, as much as he finds it important to be the best doctor, he cares most about patient care. Julius also noted "has a big heart, revealing a real vulnerability behind all that Scouse charm."

Speaking about Matty in a video for Casualty's social media, Julius said he is eager, cheeky and fun. He stated Matty would make mistakes along the way, but is just keen to put what he has learned in medical school into practice. Speaking about Matty's relationships with other characters, Julius noted that his best friend is Kim, since they trained together. He also commented on Matty's relationships with Dylan Keogh (William Beck) and Flynn Byron (Olly Rix), finding that they "bump heads" at times. Julius was attracted to the idea of playing a regular role on the show and getting to portray Matty in various situations; his first day on set was also his birthday.

==== Jade Lovall ====
Jade Lovall, portrayed by Gabriella Leon, made her first appearance on 3 November 2018. The character and Leon's casting details were announced on 15 August 2018 in an interview with producer Lucy Raffety. Jade is billed as a "workshy" student nurse who dislikes rules and detail. She is on her final work placement in the hospital's emergency department. Executive producer Simon Harper described the character as "chaotic, funny, bolshy and vulnerable". Leon called the character "a party girl" who is fun to be around. It was reported that working in the ED would "throw a stark light on the way [Jade] handles herself". Harper praised Leon's portrayl of the character and said that Jade would face a challenge learning and working in the ED.

Jade is introduced alongside Marty Kirkby (Shaheen Jafargholi), who is also a student nurse. Raffety told Sophie Dainty of Digital Spy that the two characters would impart "a whirlwind of life and fun into the ED", but would have a rivalry. Duncan Lindsay of the Metro confirmed the pair would become a new comedic partnership for the show. Harper enjoyed the relationship between Jade and Marty. Leon called the characters frenemies who "love to hate each other". Despite this, the actress opined that there is a "real genuine connection" between them.

For her portrayl of Jade, Leon was nominated for Best Soap Newcomer at the 2018 Digital Spy Reader Awards. She came in twelfth place with 1.9% of the total votes.

==== Lenny Lyons ====
Lenny Lyons, played by Steven Miller, first appeared at the beginning of series 24, on 12 September 2009 – alongside Yuki Reid (Will Sharpe), May Phelps (Laura Aikman) and Heather Whitefield (Georgia Moffett). Miller left the show in 2012, with his departure broadcast on 8 June 2012. Miller reprised his role for the 30th anniversary episode "Too Old for This Shift", which aired on 27 August 2016.

He was tutored by Nick and appears insensitive and unsuited to working as a doctor, but harbours secrets about his past. He grew up in a children's home that his childhood friend, Davey, later torched.

Lenny always puts his foot in it, and is constantly dismissed from resus for inappropriate behaviour. He had a close friendship with Yuki and helped him become closer to his colleague, May. Lenny was a foster child. He never knew his father and rarely saw his mother, in series 25 episode 1, Lenny got a memo from his mother but chose to ignore it. Following a massive tragedy, he was appointed as the one who spoke to relatives, and realised it was time to see his mother but when he rang the number on the memo, he found out that it was from a staff member trying to inform him that his mother had died two weeks before in a hospice. He later began a relationship with Chrissie. However, it was later revealed that she was working undercover to get some information on Holby, following the recent College shootings.

In series 25 it is revealed that Lenny has a younger sister, Helen Lyons, who has Aplastic Anemia and needs a bone marrow transplant. Lenny showed that he has feelings for Nurse Durrani and invited her out on a date but she stood him up. He then started to ignore her but his feelings grew for her and they were about to kiss. He finds out that Nurse Durrani is going to Pakistan for her brother's wedding and is quite angry. At the end of the episode, he runs out to say goodbye to her but she has already gone and she isn't due back for three weeks. Lenny is also seen as upset that 'Mads' Durrani has become engaged at her brother's wedding. He attempts to stop her entering a taxi of which she declines and gets in and she is attacked by the driver for having a relationship with a European man.

=== M ===
==== Sean Maddox ====
Sean Maddox, played by Gerald Kyd, made his debut appearance in the first episode of the thirteenth series, broadcast on 5 September 1998. Sean was initially billed as a "sexy junior doctor", who "is young and single and he enjoys flirting with patients and nurses alike." Sean later became a senior house officer. He formed a relationship with nurse Tina Seabrook (Claire Goose), but later had an affair with her best friend Chloe Hill (Jan Anderson), resulting in her pregnancy. Sean and Tina departed at the end of the fourteenth series. Kyd did not want to get "too comfortable" in his role and he also disliked playing the "heartthrob", as he felt it did not suit him. Kyd reprised his role in 2006 for the show's 20th anniversary and returned in episode five of the twenty-first series, which aired in October.

==== Lev Malinovsky ====
Lev Malinovsky, played by Uriel Emil, made his first appearance in episode 6 of series 34, broadcast on 28 September 2019. Lev is a paramedic for the Holby Ambulance Service, brought in as a replacement for Iain Dean (Michael Stevenson when he decided to leave the paramedic team. When Ruby Spark (Maddy Hill) sees a gang tattoo on his chest, he reveals that he previously was in a right wing gang in his home country, Russia. Faith Cadogan (Kirsty Mitchell) was later introduced to the series and revealed to be Lev's wife. Sue Haasler of the Metro branded Lev "super-competent" and was surprised by the Lev and Faith pairing.

Series producer Loretta Preece highlighted Lev's importance in Casualty, stating: "Lev has a huge story to come with many twists and turns running for at least a year ahead." In July 2020, it was announced that Lev's backstory would be explored. Digital Spy reported that "Viewers will be learning a whole lot more about enigmatic Lev, as the show begins to delve into his complex backstory", and that Lev would be "forced to confront his difficult past". They added that there would be a "rather big twist". Specific details surrounding the twist were kept secret until the airing of an episode broadcast on 18 July 2020, where it was revealed that Lev is attracted to men. Scenes featuring Maxim Samartsev as a young version of Lev showed that he had a childhood romance with a boy in Russia, and that he is possibly cheating on Faith with a man on a gay dating app. Digital Spy stated that Lev's storyline looked to be a "drama-filled" arc, and suggested it could be "one of the biggest stories of the year". Dan Laurie of the Daily Star noted viewers' shock at the twist.

==== Rash Masum ====
Rashid "Rash" Masum, played by Neet Mohan, made his first appearance in episode 11 of series 32, broadcast on 4 November 2017. Rash is a junior doctor undergoing his first year of the Foundation Programme. The character was first previewed in the show's Autumn 2017 trailer, while his casting was confirmed by Elaine Reilly of What's on TV. Producer Lucy Raffety billed Rash as "innocent, cautious and nice". Rash is mentored by nurse David Hide (Jason Durr) upon his arrival to the serial. In 2019, Mohan received his first National Television Awards nomination in the Newcomer category for his portrayal of Rash. Mohan appears as Rash in a crossover two-part episode with Casualty's spin-off series, Holby City, originally broadcast in March 2019. Mohan took a break from the drama and Rash departs the show in series 33 to pursue his dream of travelling. The character returns in the opening episode of the following series. He returns for the funeral of his mother, but he decides to work instead.

==== Jacob Masters ====
Jacob Masters, played by Charles Venn, made his first screen appearance on 18 July 2015, a week later than originally planned. Upon Venn's casting in the show, executive producer Oliver Kent described Jacob as: "...As Jacob, his good looks, charm and wit will certainly cause a tidal wave of testosterone in the emergency department. He's going to ruffle a lot of feathers and, no doubt, set a few hearts racing...".

Jacob arrives when he brings his friend into the ED following her collapse into his garage roof. He immediately rubs members of staff up the wrong way, but manages to impress clinical lead Connie Beauchamp (Amanda Mealing). She suggests that he speak to the clinical nurse manager Rita Freeman (Chloe Howman) about applying for a senior staff nurse position. He later begins work at the hospital and bumps into Louise Tyler (Azuka Oforka) who seemingly knows him. They reconciled and it is revealed they attended the same nursing school. When a hostage situation arises in the ED, Jacob is held at gunpoint along with Big Mac and Connie. Jacob manages to wrestle the gun from one of the terrorists, but when the police spring the operation he is shot in the arm, which causes major blood loss. He recovers but is enraged when he discovers the policeman who shot him would not be punished for his mistake since Jacob believes the decision to shoot him was racially motivated. Jacob uses his connections to have the name of the policeman in question sent to him, aware that knowing it would put his entire career in jeopardy. Connie reminds him of this and adds she believes that the shooting was an accident. After much deliberation, Jacob throws the letter away. After the departure of the Clinical Nurse Manager, Rita Freeman, Jacob takes her place. After the revelation that Elle Gardner's youngest son is his, he steps down to become a band five staff nurse- allowing ED veteran, Senior Charge Nurse Charlie Fairhead to take his place.

==== Siobhan McKenzie ====
Siobhan McKenzie, portrayed by Melanie Hill, is a Clinical Nurse Manager/senior sister, who made her debut appearance in the thirty-eighth series, in an episode originally broadcast on 24 February 2024. Hill's casting was confirmed in October 2023.

==== Cameron Mickelthwaite ====
Cameron "Cam" Mickelthwaite, portrayed by Barney Walsh, made his debut appearance in the series thirty-seven episode "Welcome to the Warzone", broadcast on 8 April 2023. The character and Walsh's casting was confirmed alongside a new cohort of nurses being introduced to the programme on 23 March 2023.

==== Robyn Miller ====
Robyn Miller, played by Amanda Henderson, is a staff nurse, who first appeared on 5 January 2013. She was introduced as one of four new student nurses; the others were Jamie Collier, Aoife O'Reilly and Ally Hunter. Of the four, Robyn was the last character to leave.

Robyn grew up wanting to be a nurse. She is the oldest of four siblings and volunteered to care of her Nan as a teenager. She has been told that she's a 'born nurse'. She is very competent when it comes to caring for patients but struggle with the academic side of the job. Robyn is determinedly positive and chatty. She makes friends easily and is able to charm patients with her talkative charm. However, this sometimes works against her as she loves gossip but struggles to keep secrets.

When Robyn met her fellow student nurses, she instantly struck a bond with Jamie Collier and was devastated when he left. Robyn's stepbrother, Max Walker, was later introduced and he moved in with Robyn when his music career flopped. She managed to get him a job in the ED as a porter, replacing Big Mac.

Robyn was admitted in the ED as a patient when she went back home and found a man ironing a shirt he stole from Max's wardrobe. She began to chase him to the garden and over the fence where she jumped onto a rake, impaling her foot. The man, who told Robyn his name was Nigel, helped Robyn and called 999. He stayed with her as she was admitted in the ED but missed his interview at St James' Hospital. He had left his wallet behind when he left to try and save his potential job and Robyn saw that his name was actually Lofty Chiltern. He returned, after feeling too guilty, and when questioned remained adamant that his name was Nigel. Robyn told Rita Freeman (Chloe Howman) about him and her worries and she said that she would be happy to ring the police for her and advised that Robyn should let her do so. Robyn was about to until Ben came clean and told him about everything, including his name and the interview. She accepts his apology and offers him a room at her house, to which he gladly accepts. Robyn also manages to get him a job at the ED, replacing Jamie. This pleases him and Robyn gives him the nickname, Lofty, due to him living in the loft of her house. Robyn "mentors" him and shows him the ropes and they both work on the same cases often, until he settles in properly.

Robyn wins the respect of the new ED consultant, Connie Beauchamp when she arrives and Connie later gives Robyn a good report back for her trauma course.

Inspired by a recent case in the ED that she worked on with David Hide, the two decide to open a mortality café event in the local pub. There Robyn meets Glen, an apparently sweet, punny man who had recently lost his wife to cancer. After an awkward start, their relationship blossoms and Robyn is visibly elated. However, David notices something suspicious and discovers that there is no record of Glen's wife; it surmises he has fabricated the whole thing to win Robyn's pity. Robyn is incensed and declares her wish to never see him again.

Some time later, Glen is admitted to the ED with several physical injuries. When some test results show unusual signs, he admits that he has a cancerous tumour on his brain, which explains why he was so desperate to make a connection with Robyn. In light of this, Robyn forgives him. Though Glen has been told the cancer is terminal, Robyn vows to stick by him and encourages him to consider his options; she begins to take notes on his symptoms and develop diet plans.

They visit Paris together and have other plans in mind, but right when Robyn is about to ask for his hand in marriage, Glen discovers he has less time than he originally thought, and has a seizure that sends him back into the ED. Though she is deeply troubled by the news, she remains optimistic and encouraging. Glen starts to think that marrying her would be cruel, considering he would leave her a widow after mere months, and that he is undeserving of her, but after a conversation with Dylan of all people, he decides to marry her, asking Dylan to tell Robyn while he is being treated. However, Glen develops complications during a CT scan and gets stuck in a lift en route to neurology. Robyn accepts his proposal over the intercom, and they prepare to get married that very same day. In the midst of all of this, Robyn is visibly tired and suddenly faints. Dylan administers a blood test on her, suspecting anemia, but it turns out she is pregnant. This leaves Robyn happier about her situation, since it means she will always have part of Glen with her. Unaware of this, Glen asks for paper on which to write his wedding vows just before the ceremony. He instead writes a letter to Robyn containing the message that he must leave her. Robyn is walked down the aisle only for David to hand her the letter, leaving her completely heartbroken.

==== Alicia Munroe ====
Alicia Munroe, played by Chelsea Halfpenny, is a junior doctor who first appeared in the series 30 episode "Cradle to Grave", broadcast on 19 September 2015. Alicia is undergoing her second year of the Foundation Programme, specialising in emergency medicine. Alicia is billed as "bright and bubbly" and Halfpenny said that "she's got blonde and pink hair, so people expect her to be a bit ditzy, but she's not." The show highlighted the issue of workplace bullying when Alicia began facing constant criticism from her mentor, Lily Chao (Crystal Yu). The character departed the show after appearing in eight episodes in the series 30 episode "Avoidable Harm", broadcast on 14 November 2015.

=== N ===
==== Stevie Nash ====
Stephanie 'Stevie' Nash, portrayed by Elinor Lawless, first appears in the thirty-sixth series, in an episode originally broadcast in 2021. The character and Lawless' casting details were announced on 20 May 2021, alongside that of Osi Okerafor in the role of Matthew Afolami. Steve is introduced as a consultant in emergency medicine during the show's thirty-fifth anniversary episodes. Lawless described her character as "a force to be reckoned with" and expressed her excitement at joining the cast. Loretta Preece, the show's series producer, billed Stevie as "charismatic, contemporary, compelling and on occasion very unsettling". She teased that the character's backstory would establish a new era for the serial. Describing Lawless' work, Preece stated, "Eli is an exceptional actress and a force of nature." Stevie arrives at the hospital with a personal vendetta against Ethan Hardy (George Rainsford), as she blames him for the death of her sister. Upon discovering that nurse Jade Lovall (Gabriella Leon) also blames herself for the death of Stevie's sister too, Stevie plants drugs in her locker which are discovered during a routine locker search. She then focuses on Ethan. Stevie, Ethan and a patient who is armed with a pair of scissors head up onto the hospital roof and the patient stabs Ethan. Despite wanting to leave him to die, she helps Ethan to survive.

Stevie is viciously attacked after standing up for herself to an aggressive patient. On top of bad injuries, the "most worrying aspect" of the storyline was that it had formed the beginning of a coercive control between Stevie and love interest Marcus Fidel (Adam Sina). Executive producer Jon Sen explained that the storyline would venture into how Stevie is affected by the attack, with the main effect being her getting close to Marcus since she feels that she has nobody else. Sen stated: "She feels shattered by it and thinks she's got no one else who is there for her to pick up the pieces. And so begins a coercive story for her with Marcus".

In 2025, Stevie and Rich's affair received a nomination in the "Best Soap Storyline" category the Digital Spy Reader Awards.

==== Sam Nicholls ====
Sam Nicholls, played by Charlotte Salt, is a Specialty Registrar in Emergency Medicine and a former major in the Royal Army Medical Corps. The character and Salt's casting details were announced on 30 September 2011. Salt's casting was announced the same time as Tom Kent (Oliver Coleman). Sam is billed as an "ambitious army medic" who is "fast-living, fearless and fiery". Sam also has a connection with another character. On Salt's casting, series producer Nikki Wilson commented, "Charlotte and Oliver are incredibly talented, much sought-after actors and we're delighted to welcome them to the new Casualty set in Cardiff. Both new characters are set to inject a shot of excitement into the emergency department and, as ever, both will have an air of intrigue about them." Sam makes her first appearance in the series 26 episode "Mea Culpa", first broadcast on 15 October 2011. Salt and Coleman decided to leave the series in 2013, departing in the series 28 episode "Away in a Manger", first broadcast on 14 December 2013.

In April 2017, it was confirmed that Salt has reprised her role, and would return to filming at the end of May. Producer Erika Hossington stated that Sam would return without Tom, but viewers would learn what has happened with him. Sam returns in the fifth episode of series 32, first broadcast on 23 September 2017. She returns as a new paramedic, which Salt liked as it meant she could be on-location more. Salt knew she did not want to be on the show long-term as her family is based in London and in the opening episode of series 33, Sam was killed off after receiving an injury during work. The actress was shocked to discover her character would die, but she was glad that her departure was kept hidden and felt it had a greater impact.

==== Will Noble ====
Will Noble, played by Jack Nolan, made his first appearance in the 29th episode of series 33. He is a registrar in paediatric emergency medicine who originally joined the department as a locum, but later applied for a full-time consultant position. Will became friends with Ethan Hardy (George Rainsford) in university. Upon arrival, Will treats a teenage boy, Toby, who has sustained a cut. Will notices his blood doesn't clot, and it's later revealed that Toby has leukaemia. As a surprise for Toby, Will organises all of his school friends to come to the hospital so that his patient doesn't miss out on his prom. Toby later asks Will to assist him to die. Will clashes with Archie Hudson (Genesis Lynea) continuously. Connie offers Will another interview and decides to give him the offer of Consultant. Later, after losing Toby, Will takes up Connie's offer of the position as a consultant in Emergency Medicine.

=== O ===
==== Ngozi Okoye ====
Ngozi Okoye, portrayed by Adesuwa Oni, made her first appearance in the thirty-eighth series, in an episode originally broadcast on 6 January 2024. Oni's casting was confirmed in December 2023.

Ngozi's "devastating relapse" during her alcohol addiction storyline was nominated in the "Saddest Soap Moment" category at the 2025 Digital Spy Reader Awards.

==== Patrick Onley ====
Patrick Onley, portrayed by Jamie Glover, made his first appearance in the thirty-eighth series, in an episode originally broadcast on 23 March 2024. Glover's casting was confirmed in February 2024.

==== Aoife O'Reilly ====
Aoife O'Reilly, played by Gemma-Leah Devereux, was a student nurse, who first appeared on 5 January 2013. She was introduced as part of four new student nurses; herself, Robyn Miller (Amanda Henderson), Jamie Collier (Daniel Anthony) and Ally Hunter (Rebecca Newman). Aoife left on 27 April 2013, after it was revealed that Jamie and Robyn had been offered the permanent staff nurse roles.

Aoife was born in Dublin and is the middle child of nine children. She claims that she only became a nurse because she could never gain the qualifications of a doctor. The student nurses are given a mentor with Aoife's mentor being senior nurse, Adrian "Fletch" Fletcher (Alex Walkinshaw) A day later, Aoife is left upset when Ally resigns from her role after she realises she doesn't want to be a nurse. The relationship between Aoife and Fletch becomes a father, daughter relationship but Aoife begins to think that this will be much more. She reveals this to Fletch, who tells her where she stands. Aoife gets along well with Robyn and Jamie, even when the competition for the two permanent nurse roles heats up. She is interviewed by Charlie Fairhead (Derek Thompson) and Tess Bateman (Suzanne Packer) and it goes very successful, leaving Aoife and Fletch pleased. Despite this, Jamie and Robyn are offered the role and after saying goodbye to the team, Aoife returns to Dublin.

=== P ===
==== Sophia Peters ====
Sophia Peters, played by Kellie Shirley, made her first appearance in the thirty-ninth series episode titled "Sinking Ships – Day 1", originally broadcast on 15 June 2024. Shirley's casting was announced on 12 June 2024 and her debut scenes were shown in a promotional trailer for the series. Sophia works as a psych liaison nurse and quickly makes an impression on consultant Dylan Keogh (William Beck). Shirley told Sarah Ellis from Inside Soap that she enjoyed playing Sophia because she has a "wicked sense of humour, and is at the top of her game." She added that Sophia is a "grafter", "likeable", "flirty" and "very friendly". Shirley based her portrayal of Sophia on her own mother, who worked as a nurse. She also asked her mother for advice on the meanings of medical terminology to add authenticity to the role. Shirley also knew a psych liaison nurse and gained knowledge from her. She told Elaine Reilly from What's on TV that "I did a lot of research, because I wanted Sophia to feel rooted."

Sophia's storyline with Dylan progresses into an attraction. Shirley told Ellis that Sophia finds something about Dylan's professional side "weirdly attractive" but struggles to cope with his rudeness. Each time the pair "get on to the same level", Dylan is rude to her and "annoys" Sophia. Shirley concluded that the story develops into an "ongoing thing" with "will-they-won't-they romcom vibes". Sophia and Dylan work on treating patient Benji Watts (Gwion Glyn) together. Shirley told Reilly that "both their skill sets come together. They find out that they work alongside each other nicely." She concluded that she discovers Dylan's "vulnerable side" during the shift. Writers also developed a friendship between Sophia and fellow nurse Rida Amaan (Sarah Seggari), Shirley revealed the duo have a "similar sense of humour".

Shirley reprised her role for the show's 40th anniversary in 2026. Sophia is seriously injured in an explosion at St James' Hospital and is taken to Holby ED, where a shocked Dylan desperately tries to keep her alive long enough for her to go to theatre. Despite the efforts of Dylan, Rash, and Faith, Sophia dies.

==== May Phelps ====
May Phelps, played by Laura Aikman, is one of eight new Foundation House Officer Year 2 doctors joining the department at the start of series 24. Her father is Professor Eddie Lanchester, Holby City Hospital's Dean of Medicine, who offers to help her win the prestigious Fellowship award. He gave her the answers in an envelope. She pondered over what to do then threw them in a bin. However, she changed her mind and later retrieved them. Her tutor in the ED is Ruth. May left in episode 36 of series 24 after she broke a patient's neck and made Yuki believe he had done it. She later admitted to Nick that she broke the patient's neck and Yuki was innocent.

==== Kelsey Phillips ====
Kelsey Phillips, played by Janine Mellor, made her first appearance on 6 August 2005. Kelsey was a staff nurse. She is a happy go lucky girl with a penchant for gossip, matchmaking, and generally unintentionally causing trouble in the workplace. She is notoriously bad with her finances, and during series 21 was almost forced into prostitution after being threatened with eviction for falling behind on her rent. She quickly dropped the profession when her first client turned out to be Nathan Spencer. She then revealed to Selena Donovan that Nathan was her client. Then at Tess Bateman's party Stitch Lambert caused friction and Kelsey and Nathan bonded. Kelsey thanked Nathan for not exposing her as a prostitute. She also stood up to Stitch.

Kelsey and Alice Chantrey started internet dating and both got dates but it was revealed that Kelsey's date was Big Mac, of which she was unaware. Noel took her out clubbing before Big Mac arrived. Kelsey thought she had won the lottery, and made a resignation and bought a one way plane ticket to Thailand, but it turned out to be a practical joke by Jay. She decided to leave anyway, after an eventful night involving a mugging, and a quick kiss with Big Mac.

==== Nicole Piper ====
Nicole Piper, portrayed by Sammy Dobson, made her first appearance in the thirty-eighth series in an episode originally broadcast on 23 March 2024.

=== R ===
==== Mason Reede ====
Mason Reede, portrayed by Victor Oshin, made his first appearance in the thirty-fourth series, in an episode originally broadcast on 24 August 2019. The character and Oshin's casting details were first announced on 14 August 2019. Mason is billed as an "over confident" F1 doctor who "sees himself as a high flier and someone who's going places". Mason struggles with his first shift and as a result, he has to prove himself to his colleagues in the emergency department (ED). Oshin expressed his delight at joining the cast and Simon Harper, the executive producer, revealed that the actor impressed the casting team in his first audition. He also praised him and his performance as Mason, commenting, "He's brilliant as Mason, layering the character with a deep vulnerability beneath the bravado of a junior Doctor." Harper also confirmed that the character would be a focus in the series as the drama explores the NHS at "critical breaking point". After Mason reports Rash Masum (Neet Mohan) to the clinical lead, Sophie Dainty of Digital Spy confirmed that he would cause trouble for another of his colleagues.

Sue Haasler, writing for the Metro, described the character as "tall, confident and cocky – but not in a good way", and thought he "has a massive amount to learn from the Casualty school of compassion". Dainty (Digital Spy) dubbed the character "abrupt [and] cocky" and observed that Mason had "absolutely no qualms in throwing his mentor Rash under the bus" in his first episode. On the character, she added, "But keep a close eye on this one, as all might not be as it seems."

Oshin's last episode was broadcast on 28 December 2019, when Mason was found dead in a store cupboard by Rash.

==== Yuki Reid ====
Yuki Reid, played by Will Sharpe, is an F2 Junior Doctor. He was one of eight new Foundation House Officer Year 2 doctors joining the department at the start of series 24. He had known May since the beginning of medical school and helped her out with work, secretly smitten with her. However, May leaves the series after she frames Yuki for breaking a patient's neck, causing her to become paralysed. This resulted in Yuki running away and ending up being admitted to hospital after sleeping rough. After the breakdown of Yuki and May's relationship, he became very close to fellow F2 Lenny. Yuki and the F2s spent the majority of the series competing for the JAFA award, but on the day of the award ceremony he finds out that Lenny has been guaranteed the award in return for keeping quiet about a botched medical trial. After the reveal, the JAFA is cancelled, but Mr Jordan brings both doctors back. In the same episode, 'What Tonight Means to Me – Part One', a series of flashbacks explained that Yuki's brother had cancer and died, explaining his real reason for becoming a doctor, rather than because of his relationship with May, as previously believed.

In terms of personality, whilst he is a young, intelligent and handsome man, Yuki has social anxiety, low confidence, low self-esteem, the tendency to obsess over detail and shyness. Still, he has shown that he can rise to the occasion when needed and his ability to diagnose patients is outstanding.

==== Megan Roach ====
Megan Roach, portrayed by actress Brenda Fricker, is one of the original characters of the series, making her first appearance in the first episode, "Gas", on 6 September 1986. Megan would remain as a major character until the conclusion of the fifth series in 1990 when the actress left the show. She made a one-off return in 1998 for the conclusion of the twelfth series and later would make further returns in 2007 and 2010 respectively. Megan killed herself with the aid of Charlie and Tess to end her suffering on 7 August 2010. Her return episode was voted as the third best Casualty episode ever by fans.

=== S ===
==== Ruby Spark ====
Ruby Spark, portrayed by Maddy Hill, made her first appearance on 14 July 2018. Ruby is billed as an "incredibly conscientious" and "naïve" newly qualified paramedic, who despite knowing the rules of her job, has lots to learn about being a paramedic. Ruby clashes with paramedics Iain Dean (Michael Stevenson) and Sam Nicholls (Charlotte Salt), although producer Lucy Raffety stated that Ruby would learn from Iain and Sam. Raffety told Emma Bullimore of TV Times that Ruby's introduction builds to the show's thirty-third series, which she billed as the "Year of the Paramedic". She also said that seeing paramedic life from Ruby's perspective would be "heartwarming and heartbreaking". Hill began filming in February 2018. Hill expressed her delight at joining the cast and commented, "Ruby is like no one I've ever played before." Raffety also expressed her joy at Hill's casting and praised the actress. She hoped that Ruby would become a "massive hit" with the audience. Hill appears as Ruby in a crossover two-part episode with Casualty's spin-off series, Holby City, originally broadcast in March 2019.

==== Nathan Spencer ====
Nathan Spencer, portrayed by actor Ben Price, was installed as the new corporate director of Holby city hospital NHS trust in 2005, and from the outset his unswaying mindset and failure to empathise with the human condition made him unpopular with his staff. His professional background was in banking, so his only concern was with meeting hospital targets and balancing the books. As a result, he would frequently clash with A&E consultant Harry Harper, even threatening to remove Harry from his post because he consistently refused to make any sort of (financial) compromise with patient care.

Nathan began his time at Casualty by stalking Selena Donovan. He was at one point jabbed with a needle which could possibly have been used by an HIV-positive patient. Nathan ordered a search of all clinical waste to find the needle and became more uptight than usual, with receptionist Alice Chantrey bearing the brunt of his anger. However, after being persuaded to take an HIV-test, Nathan was relieved to be given the all-clear. After starting a relationship with Selena, Nathan proposed marriage to her.

Displaying character traits of being a jobsworth and a stickler for the rules, Nathan took great pleasure in installing a large plasma TV screen in the middle of the department to enforce the "four-hour rule", a government directive in which 98% of all A&E patients must be seen, treated, and admitted/discharged within four hours of arrival. However, in blatant disregard of his own rules, on one occasion Nathan had his own mother admitted ahead of all those currently queued in the system. Harry Harper continued to clash with Nathan, so in another attempt to get rid of him, Nathan fabricated a charge of sexual harassment against him and persuaded Alice to make a complaint. Harry was suspended, but Alice became suspicious and withdrew her allegation when it threatened to devastate Harry's election campaign. Nathan was forced to confess all to Selena, who ended their engagement.

When Harry was unexpectedly elected as Holby's new MP (he stood for Parliament in a bid to save the Emergency Department from closure), Nathan installed wildcard Australian Theo "Stitch" Lambert as the new consultant. When he discovered Stitch in his office taking cocaine, he was convinced to keep quiet by the threat of the ridicule which would ensue if it was revealed Nathan had made such a poor staffing choice.

Later on in the series, Selena discovered she was pregnant with his baby. She informed Nathan that she had had an abortion; however, she later revealed to Harry that she had not actually done so. Nathan remained unaware of this until the last episode in the series, when Selena was shot dead. The team performed a Cesarean section on Selena, delivering her and Nathan a baby daughter, Angel. Angel later died in Nathan's arms after being diagnosed with a severe E. Coli infection in the NICU and he switched off her ventilator.

Nathan left the show in episode six of series 22. He was sacked for incompetence by Harry Harper, now having quit Westminster to return as the Emergency Department's consultant manager. Despite their previous working relationship Harry found the job difficult, knowing what Nathan had recently been through.

==== Patrick Spiller ====
Patrick Spiller, played by Ian Kelsey, made his first appearance in the series fourteen episode "Free Fall", broadcast on 11 December 1999. He was introduced as a specialist registrar in emergency medicine. The character was described as "Casualty's bad boy" by Marion McMullen of the Coventry Telegraph, who deemed him "arrogant, brusque and bad-tempered". Kelsey described him as "very good" at his job, but that his bedside manner becomes worse as the series develops. Patrick's storylines have included attempts to advance his career and relationships with Holly Miles, Rachel James and Lara Stone. Of Patrick's relationship with Rachel, Kelsey said "Spiller and Rachel just fancy each other – it's all about sex." Kelsey chose to leave the series in 2001 and the character was killed off. Patrick departed the series in the series sixteen episode "Past, Present, Future", broadcast on 16 March 2002.

=== T ===
==== Adam Trueman ====
Adam Trueman, portrayed by actor Tristan Gemmill, is a consultant in the emergency department.

In preparation for the role, Gemmill spent 8 hours shadowing a real consultant on an ED shift as research for the role. Describing his character, he assessed: "Adam is self-confident, witty and brash, an excellent doctor who cares deeply about his job. He presents a strong exterior to the world but perhaps has issues and vulnerabilities that suggest there is more to him than you might first expect."

Upon his arrival, Adam clashes with clinical lead Harry Harper (Simon MacCorkindale); however, they come to appreciate each other more with time. On Harry's last day, he offers Adam his job but Adam refuses and Zoe Hanna (Sunetra Sarker) is given it instead. At a party, Adam meets Jessica Harrison (Gillian Kearney) and they have a one-night stand. He was shocked to find that she is the department's new nurse when he arrives at work the next morning. He and Jessica begin an affair, but she breaks up with him when her son Lucas is injured in a road accident while they are together.

At the beginning of series 23, following Jessica's discovery that her husband was also having an affair, Gemmill explained: "Adam is hopeful they will get together again but Jessica has a more realistic approach because obviously she doesn't want to abandon her children. She's having troubles with Sean, and she sort of more or less decides that actually 'no this is not going anywhere' and she has got to get over it, forgive Sean and move on with her life, which leaves Adam quite smacked in the face really. He has a bit of an unstable time of it." Gemmill added that: "Adam's state of mind is not helped by the arrival of Nick Jordan who comes into the department as Clinical Lead and has very definite ideas of how to run the place. Adam clashes with him almost straight away and they stay at loggerheads for some time."

Later in the series, Adam's brother, Alex, who was paralysed in an accident when they were children, begins to deteriorate from a resultant illness. Adam is devastated when his brother dies, and channels his anger towards Nick, who helped Alex sign an advance directive requesting not to be resuscitated. When Adam discovers Jessica's new son Harry could be his, the two renew their relationship. He is angry when she uses Harry as bait to get her other children, Lucas and Amelia, back from their father who has taken them to Saudi Arabia. They later reconcile, and Adam proposes. Although Jessica turns him down, they stay together, and a DNA test confirms Adam is Harry's father. Jessica then later accepts Adam's proposal, and a wedding is being arranged for the New Year. Adam, Jessica and the three children are now all living together, with Adam taking an active role as father. Their New Year's Eve wedding is aborted when they are called back to the ED to deal with a major accident, and have to settle for a blessing in the hospital chapel. However, returning to the wedding venue to sign the legal papers, their car skids onto an icy lake and plunges in, ultimately leaving Jessica in a coma and Harry dead.

Jessica gradually recovers but she and Adam drift further apart, leading to her departure to America with an old school friend, Linda Andrews (Christine Tremarco) which leaves Adam devastated. He becomes increasingly reckless, having a one-night stand with young vulnerable HCA Alice Chantrey (Sam Grey) and inviting himself into a patient's house after work one night. Adam then begins a false relationship with the patient's mother, hoping to relive the paternal feelings he had for his own son, Harry, and Jessica's two other children. After this relationship disintegrates, Adam spirals further into depression.

==== Louise Tyler ====
Louise Tyler (originally Tilney), played by Azuka Oforka, is a staff nurse. She first appeared on 1 October 2011, appearing for four episodes as an ambulance dispatcher before returning as the new receptionist, drafted in to give Noel Garcia (Tony Marshall) more support following the Holby riots on 18 August 2012. Louise is extremely organised, very efficient and loves to be in control. According to the BBC Louise has no problem giving a dressing down to anyone she considers lazy, a time-waster, in the wrong, or simply in her way.

In her first episode, Louise fell out with the paramedic duty manager, Dixie Dixon (Jane Hazlegrove), and, when she returned as a receptionist, it was shown that they had still fallen out, but, episodes later, Louise had to get details of a patient who was in resus; however, she was scared of going in because of the blood. Dixie noticed this and helped her overcome this fear. Louise and Dixie then became friends. Louise became 'frenemies' with Big Mac (Charles Dale) and Noel and was often to be found in argument with them. She also helped Noel when he was left homeless and was support for Big Mac when he was held hostage by Iain's unstable army colleague, Kenny. In July 2015, it is revealed that Louise has history with new senior staff nurse Jacob Masters (Charles Venn), but asks that he does not reveal their past. It is later discovered that Louise was previously a nurse, but left the role. In August, original character Lisa "Duffy" Duffin (Cathy Shipton) makes a two-episode appearance, having previously appeared in the show for twelve years. Duffy inspires Louise to become a nurse again, a post she returns to. When Duffy returned to the ED full-time in August, it was revealed that Louise had been mentored by Duffy.

Oforka decided to leave her role as Louise in 2018 after appearing in the show for seven years. The character's exit was not announced beforehand and Louise leaves in episode 24 of the thirty-third series, originally broadcast on 16 February 2019, after a long-running storyline about an ongoing financial struggle. Oforka thanked fans for their support on social network Twitter and expressed her delight at working on the drama.

=== W ===
==== Max Walker ====
Maximilian Lyndsey Gerald "Max" Walker, played by Jamie Davis, first appeared on 5 October 2013 as the stepbrother of Robyn Miller before joining the Holby team on 16 November 2013 as a porter.

The character and casting was announced on 19 September 2013 alongside the announcement that Lee Mead would be joining that show as new nurse, Lofty Chiltern. It was announced that Davis would be playing a "very chilled and laid back" porter. The BBC have described Max as a sponge for information, that just doesn't know how to harness it all yet. They also said how he is too busy dreaming of having an extraordinary life to engage with his real one. The character was also given a Twitter account, like Robyn, Jamie Collier and Louise Tyler.

Max first arrives when himself and his friend are admitted into the ED. He is told by Robyn that he won't be able to play his guitar for at least 6 weeks. He asks her whether he can stay at her house to which she agrees. Robyn continues to tell Max that he needs to find a job and when he remains jobless after three weeks of staying with her, she finds him a job at the ED as a porter, replacing Big Mac.

Max also takes a shine to clinical lead, Zoe Hanna and they later sleep together. He also becomes friends with Jamie and when Jamie leaves for Australia, he becomes friends with his new housemate, Lofty.

Max has also pretended to be locum doctor, Cal Knight to win a girl round. When he arrived at work, he discovered that his one-night stand works at the hospital. She told him that she was the new consultant when really she had begun working at shop located there. She arrived at reception, asking for Cal but, fortunately, Max had filled Noel Garica in on what had happened and he covered for Max. When she discovered he was actually a porter called Max, she slapped him and told him she worked at the food shop and wasn't the new consultant before going off on a date with Noel.

Max is married to consultant Zoe Hanna after they moved in together in June. However, when Zoe revealed that she had slept with someone the night before their wedding, it left their relationship in tatters. After the accident at their wedding Zoe starts to try to talk to Max but each conversation is very brief and short, later on the series Max asks Zoe for a divorce as he still hasn't forgiven her. Max agrees to be friends with Zoe and tries to move on, but they later reconcile and leave the UK to build a new life together.

==== Jodie Whyte ====
Jodie Whyte, staff nurse and midwife, portrayed by Anna Chell, made her debut appearance in the series thirty-seven episode "Welcome to the Warzone", broadcast on 8 April 2023. The character and Chell's casting was confirmed alongside a new cohort of nurses being introduced to the programme on 23 March 2023. The character's storylines have included working with her estranged father, Clinical Lead, Max Cristie.

==== Ruth Winters ====
Ruth Winters (portrayed by Georgia Taylor from 2007 to 2011) is one of three new characters to join Casualty at the beginning of its twenty-second series. It was first announced on 18 July 2007 that Taylor had been cast in the role of Ruth. The BBC describe the character as "clever, hardworking and focused", stating that she has wanted to be a doctor since she was eight, and graduated top of her class – working hard at the expense of her personal life. Taylor herself has commented: "Ruth's very responsible and articulate, and seems pretty confident. But underneath it all, she's something of a troubled soul which hopefully we'll find out later on. She's very self-critical and won't allow herself to make any mistakes. But, for a junior doctor, the whole first year in a hospital is about making mistakes and learning from it. Ruth won't accept help from anyone; she thinks she knows it all."

During her first few months, Ruth misdiagnoses a patient with severe stomach pains, missing a ruptured ectopic pregnancy but blames a nurse so she can preserve her reputation. Ruth is shocked when her alcoholic father is admitted as a patient and reluctantly fakes a blood alcohol test so he will not be prosecuted for causing an accident but is devastated to realise he has manipulated her into this. Ruth goes on to give a patient the wrong medication and orders a nurse to remove another patient's neck brace, leaving them paralysed as a result. She lies about her culpability and accidentally gives a patient a morphine overdose. When a suicidal patient dies in her care, Ruth confesses her mother committed suicide when she was a child. When Ruth misdiagnoses yet another patient, resulting in his death, she hangs herself. She is in a coma for a month, but eventually recovers.

She becomes close to colleague Toby de Silva, and they have what Taylor describes as a "brother/sister relationship where they love each other but they can't stand each other." Ruth sleeps with new department head, Nick Jordan, only to be rejected by him the next morning. She goes on to begin a tentative relationship with nurse Jay Faldren. Series producer Oliver Kent commented on their pairing: "Ruth's never allowed romance into her life, but when she starts to get close to Jay, the possibility of happiness with another person suddenly presents itself to her. But the question is, will she allow herself? Or will his laddish ways get in the way? She's so obsessed with her career that she's always tempted to put that first." In series 24, the first episodes show that Ruth and Jay are continuing their relationship – keeping it from their colleagues for her benefit but this annoys Jay, giving her the ammunition to kiss him in public but, when they head home, Ruth realises she has missed some pills and worries she could be pregnant. Discovering that she is pregnant, she takes a pill to terminate the pregnancy without telling Jay. On her birthday, Jay gives her a necklace for their date at the surgeon's dinner. Ruth's happiness is short-lived when senior medic Sarah Evans warns her that Jay is bad news and that she'll think twice about recommending her for the surgical training post if she continues to see him. Feeling unwell, Ruth cancels their date, but is confronted by Jay at the dinner. As Ruth leaves, she collapses and is taken into casualty. Mortified to be treated by her colleagues, she swears Tess to secrecy over the abortion pill, despite knowing that Jay is panic-stricken. When her condition stabilises, Ruth admits that she was pregnant and she and Jay share a tender moment. When Sarah Evans tells Ruth that she must remain focused if she wants to work as a surgeon, Ruth dumps Jay for the sake of her career.

Later in the series, her brother Jonathan, visits and reveals that he has just been released from prison. Ruth is horrified to see Jonathan when he turns up, looking for her help, much to Jay's surprise, who didn't realise she had a brother. Jonathan swears that he has turned over a new leaf but she sees his track marks, refuses to believe he's changed. Later, a group of hard-drinking homeless men cause havoc when they steal bottles of alcohol-based hand sanitiser and take it to an hospital annexe to enjoy in private. Tragedy strikes when young security guard, Mick, desperate for Ruth's approval, confronts the homeless men but Jonathan is quick to get help. Ruth looks forward to celebrating Christmas with her brother when she notices an heirloom is missing from her flat and plunged into a world of stolen phones, heroin overdoses and male prostitution, Ruth realises that she's likely to face Christmas alone. Days after a lonely Christmas, Ruth and Jay are thrown together on a medical case and Ruth finally admits that she's lonely. Letting down her guard, she accepts Jay's comfort and the pair go home together. However, this is short lived, when Ruth admits that she terminated the pregnancy, leading to Jay dumping her. This leads to her to build the courage to admit she loves him but he walks away anyway.

Months later, Ruth has a big presentation that goes horribly wrong. When conference organiser and big name doctor Edward takes an interest in her, she's incredibly flattered and a little bit smitten. Ruth married Edward Thurlow, Clinical Director of Neurosurgery on 26 June 2010, making Jay too late when he pleads his undying love at the register office, leaving Ruth to reveal that she has already married. Despite marrying Edward, it is hinted that Ruth still has feelings for Jay and that he feels the same. However, Ruth's feelings are spurned when she discovers Jay is dating Polly. She makes an effort with her marriage only to be neglected and ignored by Edward. While waiting for Edward to return home from work, she discovers that Edward is having a gay affair. She confronts him and makes a deal with him. For the sake of their reputations, they will stay married given that he can be with any man (except his lover) and as long as he helps her career. This agreement seems to suit them both until Ruth realises that she still loves Jay. She tries to end the marriage but Edward says that he loves her and that she is enough for him which makes her reluctant to change the situation.

However, in series 25 episode 17, Edward's boyfriend begins working with Ruth in the Emergency Department. This is followed by Ruth's realisation that he is still seeing her husband. Later, Edward leaves Ruth for his boyfriend. Later in series 25 episode 21, Ruth is sectioned after trying to operate on someone in the on-call room. She is diagnosed with bipolar disorder. In series 26, Ruth and Jay reunite and in episode 13 Ruth discovered she was pregnant. In series 26 episode 16, Ruth and Jay leave together.

=== Z ===
==== Ellen Zitek ====
Ellen Zitek, played by Georgina Bouzova, made her first appearance in the series nineteen episode "Out With a Bang", broadcast on 18 September 2004. Bouzova was looking for work elsewhere from acting when producers offered her the role of Ellen. She said that it was "amazing" opportunity and took the role. The actress was contracted with the show for four months but this was later extended because the character became popular with viewers. Producers only ever envisioned Ellen as a "stand-in character" but she became a successful character on-screen. The actress quit the show and filmed her final scenes in the latter half of 2006. The character was killed off after a motor bike collided with her.

== Recurring and guest characters ==
=== Denise Andrews ===
Denise Andrews, played by Kate McEvoy, is the sister of Linda Andrews (Christine Tremarco), that first appeared on 21 January 2012 for one episode, before returning on 18 August 2012 for seven episodes. She departed on 6 October 2012.

Denise first appears looking for Linda in January 2012 with her daughter Britney (Devon Beigan) and Joe (Taylor Parry) on the run after Britney attacks a social worker. Denise leaves Britney and Joe in Linda's care and hands herself into the police for Britney's crime. Denise returns in August 2012, following her release from prison, hoping to get the cleaner's job in the ED. After getting the job, Denise spends most of her day winding Linda up until she decides to return to Liverpool with her children.

=== Ella Ashford ===
Ella Ashford, played by Tahirah Sharif, is the daughter of Martin Ashford (Patrick Robinson), who first appeared on 4 May 2013. After Ella stole ketamine from Martin, he rang the police and Ella was arrested on 17 May 2014. This was Sharif's last appearance on the programme.

Ella, then aged approximately 16 years, first appeared while on a night out with her friend. She is hit by a police car, while the driver (Danny Midwinter) is intoxicated with alcohol. His fellow officer (Connor McIntyre) takes the blame and says he hit Ella. Ella and her friend are later caught stealing from a corner shop, so she sprays an aerosol in the owner's eyes – and when they all end up in the ED, the girl manages to convince her dad she wasn't to blame, convincing Zoe Hanna (Sunetra Sarker) that Ash is far too soft on his daughter. Ella begins getting up to her old tricks again, masterminding an off-licence robbery that ends up with four youngsters in the ED – but Ash still refuses to accept his daughter is as troubled as everyone else believes. Zoe then becomes annoyed when Ella is once again admitted to the ED because the only reason she has been admitted is for being exceptionally drunk. Despite Ash standing by his daughter, he does eventually recognise Ella's faults. Ella is not seen again until she arrives in the ED for a work placement. Lily Chao (Crystal Yu) is put under control of her by Ash. Lily becomes frustrated by Ella and tells her to help nurses, Jamie Collier (Daniel Anthony) and Robyn Miller (Amanda Henderson). Jamie tells her to go and read some magazines in the staff lounge room but Lily finds her and tells her off. Ella then watches while Robyn assists a lady who is in panic because having a scan. Ella tells Robyn that if she was in the ED, having a scan like that she would want Robyn as her nurse too because she is so kind.

Ella is next seen on webchat with her friend, Millie. They end webchat and on her way to school, Millie's dad, Sacha's phone rings and it turns out to be Ella, who is secretly having an affair with him. Millie finds out and has an argument with Ella. Ash finds the girls arguing and demands an explanation. Ella reveals the truth and Millie falls out with her. Ash then tells Ella that he will speak to Laura and she will be living with him from now onwards. Ella attends a party at the house of Robyn, Max Walker (Jamie Davis) and Lofty Chiltern. She meets up with her friend, Jason who gives her drugs; Ella has an allergic reaction and has to be admitted to the ED. Ash later has Ella arrested after she stole a large amount of ketamine from his possession to take with her friends. One friend later dies from taking the ketamine. Ella is imprisoned for her crime and is released in January 2015.

=== Mike Bateman ===
Mike Bateman, portrayed by Louis Emerick, first appears in the series 18 episode "End of the Line – Part One". Emerick's casting and the concept of the character were announced on 17 June 2003, while further details about the character, including his name, were announced on 25 August 2003. Mike is introduced as the fireman husband of Tess Bateman (Suzanne Packer). Emerick and Packer previously portrayed a married couple on Brookside, and also worked together in the play Playboy of the West Indies in 1985. The actors were excited to work with each other again and Packer felt their history aided their on-screen connection. Emerick was initially contracted for four episodes. Mike's backstory states that he and Tess have been married for twenty years upon their introduction, and they share three children, including a son, Sam Bateman (Luke Bailey). Mike first appears when working at the scene of a double train crash. He is suspended for negligence surrounding his work on the crash. Emerick explained that Mike's job is "in jeopardy". Mike resigns from his job, causing the couple financial worry. Emerick called the story "fantastic" and said it was something the actors could "really get [their] teeth into". Emerick reprised the role in 2005 as part of a story exploring Sam's bipolar disorder. Mike is surprised to learn about Sam's illness and is annoyed that Tess did not tell him. They argue and he "storms off", before being involved in a car crash, leaving him critically injured. The actor returned again in 2006 for an episode where Mike asks Tess for a divorce.

=== Tamzin Bayle ===
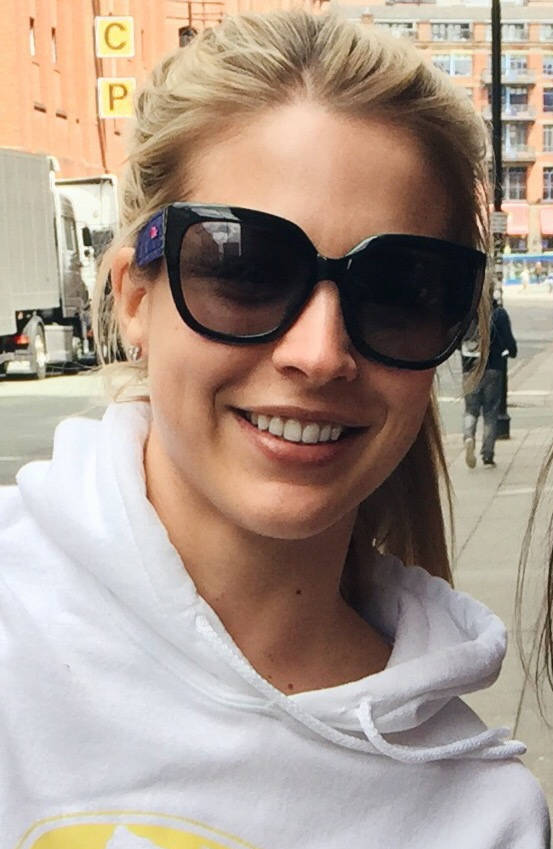
Actress Gemma Atkinson (pictured) portrayed paramedic Tamzin Bayle across three guest stints between 2011 and 2014.

Tamzin Bayle, played by Gemma Atkinson, is a paramedic who first appeared on 13 August 2011, alongside Omar Nasri (Dhaffer L'Abidine). Atkinson & L'Abidine's casting and characters was announced on 17 May 2011. They were written out seven episodes later on 1 October 2011. It was announced on 5 May 2012 that Atkinson would reprise her role as Tamzin at the beginning of series 27. Tamzin returned on 18 August 2012, but left again on 8 December 2012. Tamzin was shown in a trailer showing what was coming up on Casualty in summer 2014, indicating that she would be returning. Her return was confirmed by a cast list released by Radio Times for the episode dated 24 May 2014. Atkinson confirmed that she would be departing for the last time following Matt Bardock, who plays Tamzin's paramedic colleague Jeff Collier's departure and she leaves following his funeral, on 11 October 2014.

Upon her arrival, Tamzin immediately gets off on the wrong foot when she accidentally breaks fellow paramedic, Jeff Collier (Matt Bardock)'s beloved A-Team mug and the pair later put Jeff's nose out of joint when they steal their "shout". Following Omar's disagreement with Jeff about putting targets before patients, Omar is asked to leave. Tamzin decides to stick with Omar and they leave Holby City Hospital.

Less than a year later, Tamzin returns to the hospital after gaining further experience and deciding to try again at Holby. She is thrown into the deep end as she, Jeff and Dixie Dixon (Jane Hazlegrove) go to an accident at a music festival with doctors, Sam Nicholls (Charlotte Salt) and Tom Kent (Oliver Coleman). After some encouragement from Dixie, Tamzin asks Tom if he is single – which doesn't go unnoticed by Sam. Jeff and Tamzin later treat a small child called Lucy whose mother, Taylor, is struggling to cope. Consultant, Dylan Keogh (William Beck) becomes protective over Lucy and becomes angry with Taylor over her care. Tamzin steps in to defend Taylor, leaving Jeff wondering why. He later continues to become concerned over Tamzin when they attend to an injured lap dancer.

Following Dixie's three-month suspension she is called in to cover for her, to the shock of Jeff. After Jeff's relationship with Samantha ends, Tamzin reveals she has called off her engagement. He asks Dixie for a divorce, to which she complies. At the scene of a car crash, Jeff is killed in an explosion. Tamzin breaks down in Dixie's arms when she is told.

Tamzin is seen at Jeff's funeral and breaks down into Big Mac's arms during the service. After the service, she and Dixie share a heartfelt conversation where Dixie gives a jacket to Tamzin, before Tamzin reveals she can't stay at Holby. She then leaves and is replaced by Iain Dean (Michael Stevenson), who had previous worked in Holby and returned for the funeral.

=== Grace Beauchamp ===
Grace Beauchamp, portrayed by Emily Carey, first appears in the series 29 episode "Losing Grip". She is introduced in a semi-regular role as the teenage daughter of Connie Beauchamp (Amanda Mealing). The character previously appeared with Connie in Casualty's spin-off series, Holby City between 2007 and 2010. After a six-episode stint, Grace departs with her grandmother, Audrey Strachan (Frances Tomelty). The character returns in series 30, alongside her father, Sam Strachan (Tom Chambers), who also appeared in Holby City. Her return was confirmed in December 2015. She continues to appear in a recurring capacity across series 31 and following a short cameo appearance in the first episode of series 32, Carey confirmed she had left the serial. Writers used Grace's exit to develop new stories for Connie. The character's return was confirmed on 16 December 2020, via a promotional trailer. Upon her return, Grace's struggle at being in Holby is explored, and she becomes a love interest for paramedic Leon Cook (Bobby Lockwood). Loretta Preece, the show's series producer, told Sophie Dainty from Digital Spy that Grace returns "beautiful and forthright" with a hope to be "noticed and appreciated" by Connie. She added that the pair have a difficult relationship and "in many ways the apple doesn't fall very far from the tree". Preece also praised Carey and expressed her pleasure at having her in the cast. The character appears in series 35 for a seven-episode stint, departing as part of Mealing's exit from Casualty.

Grace arrives at Holby City Hospital's emergency department (ED) with Connie after being expelled from boarding school. They share a poor relationship due to Connie's work commitments, and consequently, Grace acts out and causes disruption in the ED. Audrey arrives after Grace's nanny quits. After someone contacts social services, Connie has a meeting to discuss her treatment of Grace. When Connie prioritises a demanding patient over time with Grace, she tells Connie that she wants to live with Audrey instead. While at the ED, Grace goes missing and panic arises that Rita Freeman's (Chloe Howman) estranged husband, Mark Richie (Joel Beckett), who is a paedophile, has abducted her. Grace is found safe and leaves with Audrey to live with Sam.

A year later, Connie learns that Grace is in the UK with Sam and his girlfriend, Emma Dufresne (Elizabeth Croft). When Emma is admitted to the ED, Grace gets to spend time with Connie. As they prepare to leave, Connie apologises to Grace for letting her go and asks her to stay. Grace walks in on Connie and Jacob Masters (Charles Venn) kissing and is furious; she gives Connie an ultimatum, threatening to return to America if she does not end the relationship; Connie break. At a school sports day, Connie helps Grace befriend Carmel Sims (Sydney Wade). Grace has a sleepover at Carmel's house, but when Carmel injures her leg on a trampoline, Grace runs home to get Connie, but finds her and Jacob together. She tells Connie that she hates her. At the ED, Connie and Jacob treat Carmel, learning that she is malnourished and self-harming. Upon hearing Carmel's mother, Steph Sims (Tonicha Lawrence), berating her daughter, Connie reports her to social services. Grace speaks with Connie and Jacob and gives her blessing to the relationship.

Connie and Grace leave the ED in the car, followed by a furious Steph; she drives recklessly and causes them to crash, plummeting off a cliff. They are thrown from the car and are found by Jacob and paramedics Iain Dean (Michael Stevenson) and Jez Andrews (Lloyd Everitt). Grace is airlifted to the ED, but en route, the helicopter collides with a drone, crashing into the department's entrance and worsening Grace's condition; she has a subdural haematoma which leaves her in a coma. She later has a pseudoaneurysm and has to be operated on by Jac Naylor (Rosie Marcel) and Guy Self (John Michie). Despite initial hesitation, Connie agrees to the operation and Grace survives. Connie refuses to leave Grace's bedside and she slowly awakens from her coma, albeit withdrawn and nearly mute. She cannot walk and struggles to eat without assistance.

As Grace is discharged from hospital, Connie treats her friend Hugo Bonning (Billy Angel) and lies about Grace's whereabouts when he asks. However, when they bond, she takes Hugo to see Grace. Grace continues to recover through physical therapy and Connie's care, eventually walking with the aid of a crutch. Connie struggles with Grace's injures and convinces herself that there is a medical error in her case notes. She complains to the hospital board about Grace's treatment under Elle Gardner's (Jaye Griffiths) care, which results in a hearing. To aid her case, Connie takes Grace to the hearing and claims that she is critically ill. Grace struggles in the courtroom and goes to the toilets, where she smashes a mirror, before collapsing with a seizure. Elle finds Grace and saves her life. At the hospital, Grace is diagnosed with epilepsy and undergoes surgery, while Connie retracts her statement in thanks.

Grace does not talk to anyone following her operation. Sam asks for a psychologist to assess her, but they reveal it is not psychological and it is Grace's decision. Sam gives Grace a mobile tablet and she uses it to write that everything is Connie's fault, devastating her mother. On her birthday, Grace responds excitedly to her presents from Sam, but rejects gifts from Connie and tells her that she hates her. Grace has another seizure, so Sam decides that Grace should live with him. When Sam is unable to attend one of Grace's physiotherapy session, Connie attends instead. Grace later shows off her progress to the ED staff as she no longer needs aid in walking. When given the opportunity to move back in with Connie, Grace decides to stay with Sam, having witnessed Connie prioritise work over her again. Connie later visits Grace and Sam at home, but finds the house empty. She then learns that they have returned to America.

=== Mercedes Christie ===
Mercedes Christie, played by Hannah Spearritt, made her first screen appearance on 23 January 2016. She made her final appearance on 7 May 2016.

The character and Spearritt's casting was announced on 18 December 2015, with Mercedes described as "mysterious". Spearritt, who was most known as a singer in the pop band S Club 7, had previous acting experience in Primeval. Following the announcement, Spearritt wrote on social network, Twitter: "I'm so happy to say i've joined the BBC Casualty as Mercedes Christie...very excited! @BBCCasualty". Spearritt described Mercedes as "edgy and manipulative" and commented that she was "different" to her previous roles and "potentially a bit of a challenge". Spearritt revealed that after her audition for the role of Mercedes she was "all teary" and spent days in a "self-conflicted isolation", hoping she had won the part. For the role, Spearritt "grimed" herself up and bought several hair braids, nose rings, ear cuffs, "hippy-themed" earrings amongst other items. Spearritt also dyes her hair lilac weekly for continuity reasons. Spearritt described her first scenes as "pretty action-packed" and "fun" to film. She also praised the cast and crew for being "warm and welcoming".

=== Jamie Cleveland ===
Jamie Cleveland, played by Ryan Hawley, made his first appearance in the thirty-eighth series episode titled "Sinking Ships – Day 2", originally broadcast on 15 June 2024. Hawley's casting was announced on 12 June 2024 and his debut scenes were shown in a promotional trailer for the series. Jamie works as a hospital board member and is an old friend of nurse Cameron Mickelthwaite (Barney Walsh).

=== Ciaran Coulson ===
Ciaran Coulson, portrayed by Rick Warden, first appears in the thirty-third series, in an episode originally broadcast on 1 June 2019. The character was first announced in the 25–31 May 2019 issue of Inside Soap, while Warden's casting was revealed later in the month. Warden expressed his joy at playing the role, saying that he is "having fun with Ciaran". Lucy Raffety, the show's series producer, praised Warden, calling him "phenomenal". Ciaran is a troubleshooter hired to improve the emergency department (ED) and was introduced as a rival for clinical lead Connie Beauchamp (Amanda Mealing). He is hired by Henrik Hanssen (Guy Henry), the hospital's chief executive officer, and is given permission to enforce changes without Connie's consent, infuriating her. Warden previously appeared in a recurring role on Casualty's spin-off series Holby City in 2010, and starred opposite Mealing. The pair enjoyed working with each other again. Ciaran quickly clashes with many characters, including Connie and senior nurse Jacob Masters (Charles Venn). Ciaran is unimpressed when Jacob is late to work and confronts him, unaware of his background. Warden enjoyed filming the clashes between Ciaran and Jacob as Venn is much taller and stronger than him.

The character is billed as direct and someone who is quick to clash with others. Warden branded him "Napoleonic, arrogant and ruthless" and explained that although "his manner is abrasive", he is doing the job given to him. When Ciaran is wrong, he is able to admit fault, and is keen to help those who have been mistreated. Warden described him as "the hero of his own story" rather than a villain. Mealing called Ciaran "a real villain" and likened him to the male version of her character. Venn thought that Ciaran "wields his power in a very obnoxious manner and grates on a lot of people". He also described him as "raging, power hungry man" with a Napoleon complex. The character's backstory states that he has experience in management as well as trauma medicine in America.

Writers scripted Ciaran into Connie's prescription medication addiction story. Raffety explained that Ciaran's introduction would "[compound Connie's] feelings of inadequacy and anxiety". Warden thought that Ciaran "exacerbated" Connie's struggles, but would sympathise with her "to a point". Mealing noted that Ciaran's constant observations of her makes Connie feel "as though she has a target on her back". After Connie blames registrar Archie Hudson (Genesis Lynea) for her mistake in a medical procedure, Ciaran begins to suspect that Connie is at fault and consults Archie. They work together to bring down Connie. Warden explained that they develop "a relationship of convenience or politics" and become friends. While Connie is away, Ciaran moves into her office and when she returns, she is furious and demands he leave. Warden told Elaine Reilly of What's on TV that "the trouble is when someone as arrogant as Ciaran meets someone like Connie, they just can't be easily in the same space."

Ciaran is also incorporated into senior nurse Duffy's (Cathy Shipton) dementia story when he questions her capability. Warden pointed out that Ciaran is concerned about her living with dementia and having a senior position in the ED. Shipton told Alice Penwill of Inside Soap that Ciaran is a "box-ticker" and Duffy's dementia status is an issue. His concerns leads to Duffy resigning from her job. Duffy then begins a non-clinical role, but is involved in an incident with Connie, who blames her. Ciaran believes that Duffy is innocent, but needs her to be a witness against Connie. Warden thought that the scenes were "sensitive [and] nuanced".

At the conclusion of Connie's story, the character was written out of the series, departing in the final episode of series 33, in an episode originally broadcast on 10 August 2019. Connie falsifies prescriptions to make it seem that Ciaran is overprescribing medication. He attends a meeting with Hanssen, who informs him that his contract would not be renewed. On 12 March 2021, it was confirmed that Warden had reprised his role as Ciaran.

The character received a negative response from viewers, which Warden expected due to his characterisation. Despite this, the actor was also told by schoolchildren that Ciaran was "the best doctor in Casualty". Sue Haasler, writing for the Metro, described the character as "dreadful" and "an annoying little man". Reilly (What's on TV) dubbed Ciaran "Mr Mean" and said his introduction was "unforgettable". She added that he has "an abundance of wicked one-liners".

=== Ellisson family ===
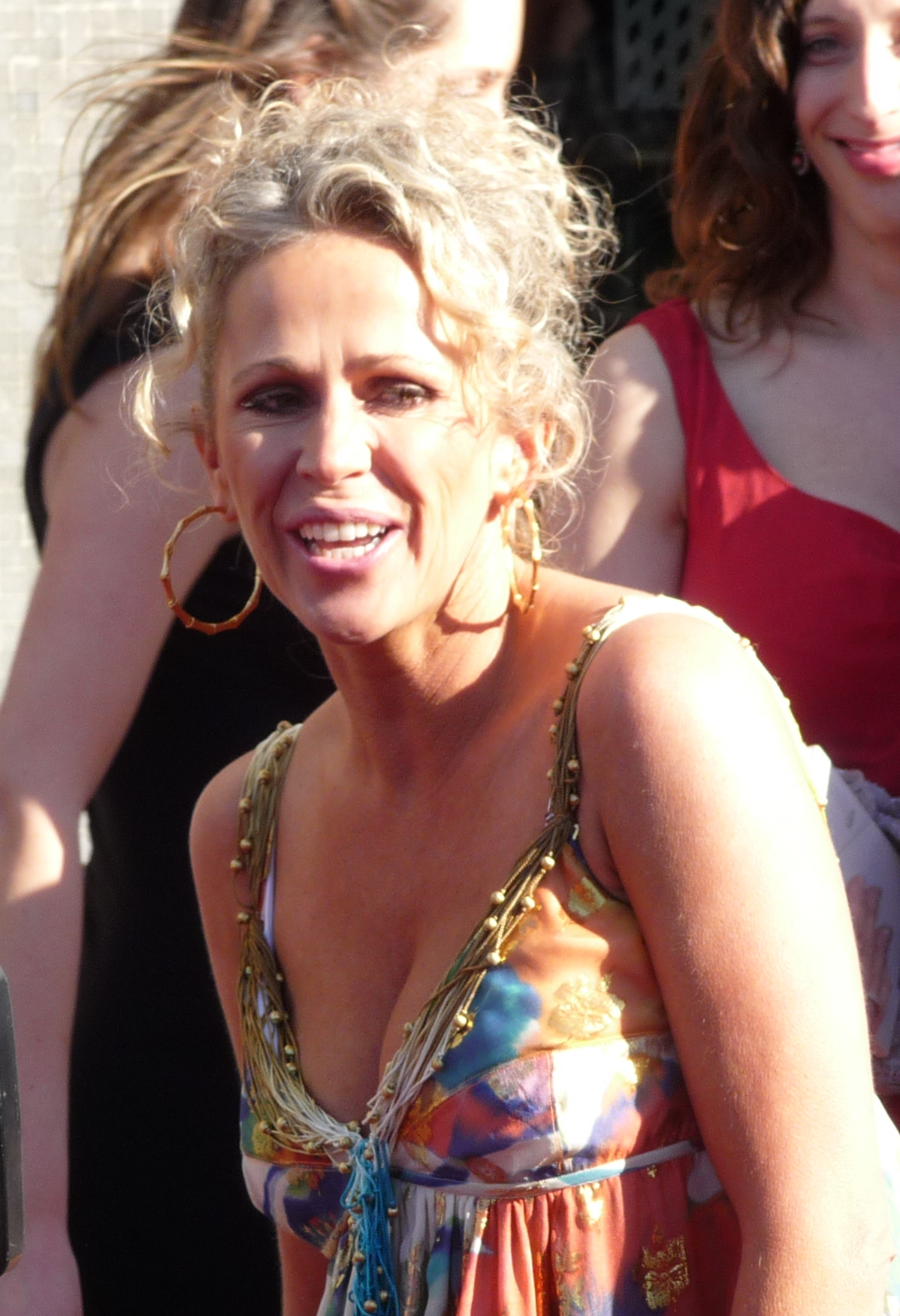
Lucy Benjamin (pictured) portrays Ellisson family matriarch, Denise.

The Ellisson family consists of Roy Ellisson, played by John Killoran, his wife Denise Ellisson, played by Lucy Benjamin, and their sons, Scott Ellisson, played by Will Austin, and Mickey Ellisson, played by Mitch Hewer. Roy and Denise appeared in one episode on 30 September 2015 and were reintroduced in 2017; Roy returned on 22 April 2017 and Denise returned on 29 April 2017. Upon Roy and Denise's reintroduction, Scott and Mickey were introduced and they debuted on 22 April 2017. Roy departed on 29 April 2017 and Scott and Denise departed on 22 July 2017, whereas Hewer joined the recurring guest cast.

Producer Erika Hossington praised the Ellissons' first episode, saying, "that was a really important episode for us because it examined race and that was something else that we wanted to bring into the frame this year in terms of the way the UK has gone." She revealed that the family would be reintroduced following positive fan response, which "can only mean bad things for the ED." Further details surrounding their return were announced on 16 March 2017, when it was announced that Hewer would be joining the show's recurring guest cast. Hewer commented, "I'm very excited for people to meet Mickey and for them to feel the difficulties that he endures in his life." The show's executive producer, Simon Harper, expressed his delight at Hewer joining the cast and explained, "we met Mickey's parents in 2015, but don't judge a book by its cover. Mickey isn't necessarily cut from the same cloth in his dealings with the Casualty regulars and there will be absolutely explosive consequences." The character of Scott and Austin's casting was also announced on 16 March 2017.

Alison Graham, writing for the Radio Times, branded the Ellisson family "Holby's tiny band of violently industrious fascists" and called Mickey "gormless" and a "dope", quipping he is "too dumb to draw breath". She also grew bored of the storyline featuring Ethan Hardy's (George Rainsford) revenge on Scott, commenting, "There are only so many shots of Ethan looking wan and tragic that any human being can stand." The critic later labelled Scott "the omnipresent Holby fascist" and noted that whenever a member of the family are admitted into the ED, the remaining members of the family "hover like moths at a barbecue".

=== Louis Fairhead ===
Louis Fairhead, played by Gregory Foreman, is Charlie Fairhead (Derek Thompson) and Baz Wilder's (Julia Watson) son. He was born during the eleventh series. In 2015, Foreman revealed that he had been abused in the streets due to Louis' behaviour towards his father. The actor stated, "A lot of people dislike Louis because they have such an affection for Charlie. They want him to be nice to his dad rather than put him down." Louis develops a heroin addiction.

=== Blake Gardner ===
Blake Gardner, played by Kai Thorne, is the son of Elle Gardner (Jaye Griffiths) and Jacob Masters (Charles Venn). He made his first appearance on 3 June 2017, where he was brought into the emergency department after being beaten up at school. Blake developed a crush on his father's coworker, Sam Nicholls (Charlotte Salt), and tried to kiss her. She pushed him away, and he left in embarrassment. In October 2018, Blake met his grandmother Omo, and helped her shopping. On the bus, she began hearing voices due to her schizophrenia, and she left Jacob on the bus.

=== Zsa Zsa Harper-Jenkinson ===
Zsa Zsa Harper-Jenkinson, portrayed by American actress Sharon Gless, appeared in the thirteenth episode of series 32. Zsa Zsa is a neurosurgeon and the former mentor of Dylan Keogh (William Beck). She is billed as "a maestro of surgery". Gless expressed her delight at appearing in one episode of Casualty and called Zsa Zsa a "wonderful character". Gless told Elaine Reilly of What's on TV that Zsa Zsa has a large soul and is humorous and "often inappropriate", which she liked. Alison Graham of Radio Times described Zsa Zsa as "acerbic, funny and a wee bit flirty". Producer Daf Llwelyn asked Gless to film an episode for the show, which Gless stated marked the "first time Casualty have flown an American over to play a role." The actress enjoyed the character and working on the serial. She expressed an interest in reprising the role if invited to. As Dylan's former mentor, Zsa Zsa trained him to become a surgeon, although they lost contact due to Dylan's "emotionally withdrawn" personality. When Dylan calls her and asks that she perform surgery on terminally ill Glen Thomas (Owain Arthur), Zsa Zsa immediately arrives.

=== Oliver Hide ===
Oliver "Ollie" Hide, played by Harry Collett, first appeared on 24 September 2016. Oliver is the son of David Hide (Jason Durr) and Rosalene Hide (Lorraine Pilkington). Due to his parents initially being separated, Oliver lives with Rosalene, but later decides he wants to live with his father, David. Oliver stands on the edge of a bridge, not planning to jump in. When David finds him, he assumes Oliver is attempting suicide, so tries to talk him down. Oliver falls in, and David saves him.

On 18 June 2022, in the episode "Wednesday's Child", Ollie is involved in a school shooting, where he and his friend Rob shot students in their school. Ollie is shot by Rob and dies of his injuries at the end of the episode, much to the disbelief of his parents.

=== Sally Hodge ===
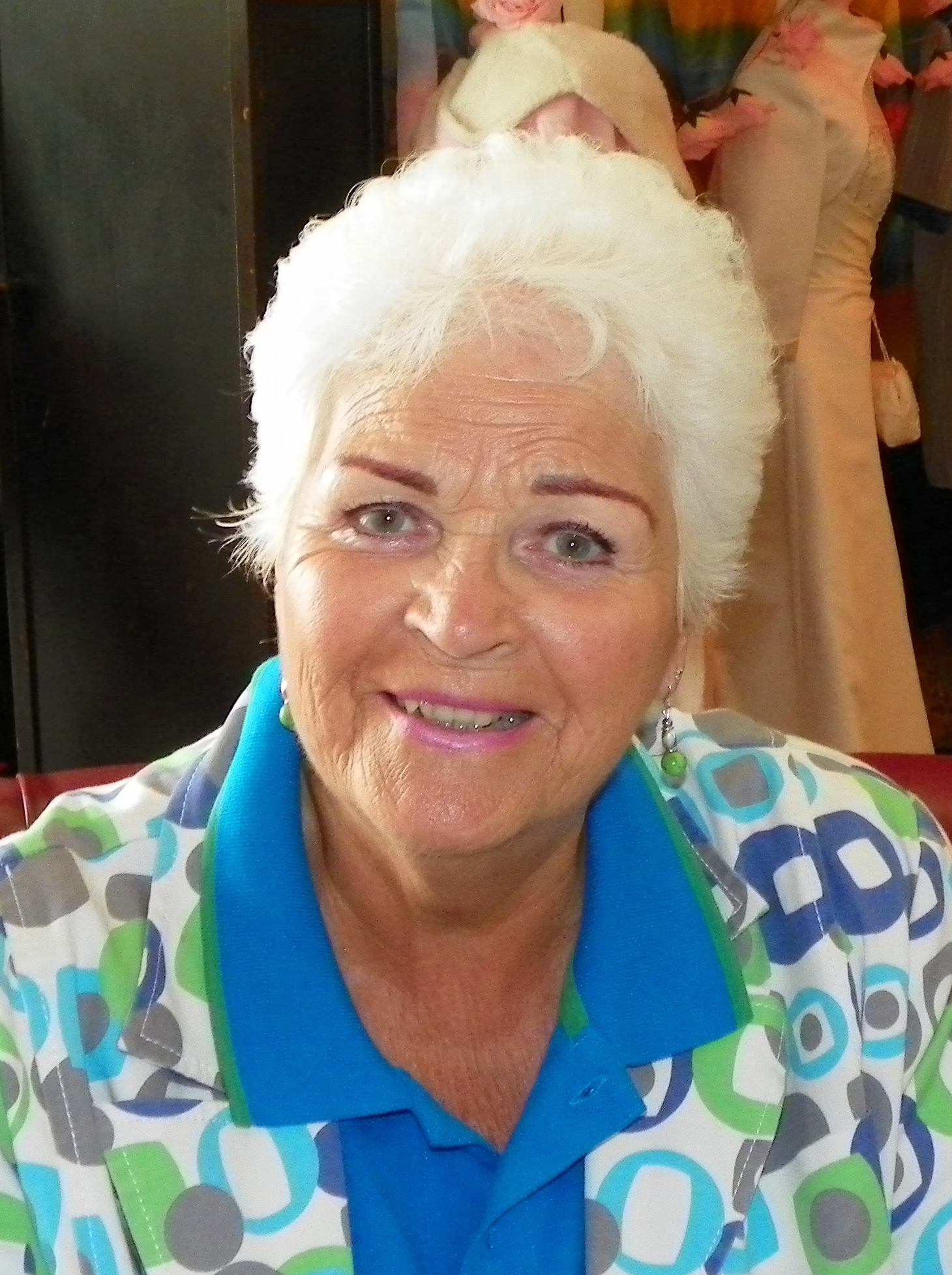
Pam St. Clement (pictured), who plays Sally.

Sally Hodge, played by Pam St. Clement, appeared on 27 August 2016. Sally appeared as a patient, treated by Charlie Fairhead (Derek Thompson) in the first episode of series 31, which celebrated the show's thirtieth anniversary.

Sally was admitted in the emergency department following a fall at her flat. She was treated by Lily Chao (Crystal Yu), Louise Tyler (Azuka Oforka) and Charlie, the latter of whom suspected she had fractured her hip. Sally was rude to the staff, especially Charlie. Lily performed an abdominal exam on Sally and requested more tests, before concluding she had a urinary tract infection. Lily later discovered that Sally actually had a lithopaedion. She tearfully admitted to Charlie that she became pregnant whilst a teenager and self-aborted her child, while telling people she had miscarried. Sally then praised Charlie, calling him a good man, before inadvertently revealing a surprise party planned in honour of Charlie. Lily later informed Charlie that Sally had been admitted to a ward.

The character and casting was announced on 2 August 2016, with EastEnders legend, St. Clement in the role of patient Sally Hodge. Sally was billed as a "grumpy, surly and crotchety" patient that "makes life hell" for charge nurse Charlie Fairhead (Thompson) because is "distrustful" of him. Of her working relationship with Thompson, St. Clement said that "with a bit of luck we absolutely clicked". St. Clement's character in EastEnders was considered tough, but St. Clement joked that "if Sally was walking down the same street as Pat Butcher, Pat would neatly sidestep on to the opposite pavement." She described Sally as "unfortunate woman" due to her "emotional baggage" and therefore, she does not "come over as being very nice". St. Clement added that Sally is a "nice, complicated character to play" and that it was "a privilege to play a guest role within this incredible episode". Executive producer, Oliver Kent announced his "delight" at St. Clement's casting, stating that is "fantastic" to place "two TV greats" in one episode. He described the scenes that St. Clement and Thompson share as "a truly brilliant moment in the episode". Elaine Reilly of What's on TV included Sally's arrival in an article stating six things she could not "wait to see" in the anniversary special, hoping that "demanding" Sally would be Charlie's "worst patient yet". Justin Harp of Digital Spy described Sally as "a true badass". Duncan Lindsey of Metro.co.uk described Sally as "difficult to please".

Upon looking at the Twitter response to St. Clement's appearance, Radio Times said that fans "enjoyed" her appearance on the show. Sharon Marshall, writing for Mirror.co.uk, described St. Clement's appearance as "gorgeous" and said it reminded her what an "awful" decision it was to kill her EastEnders' character Pat.

=== Samantha Kellman ===
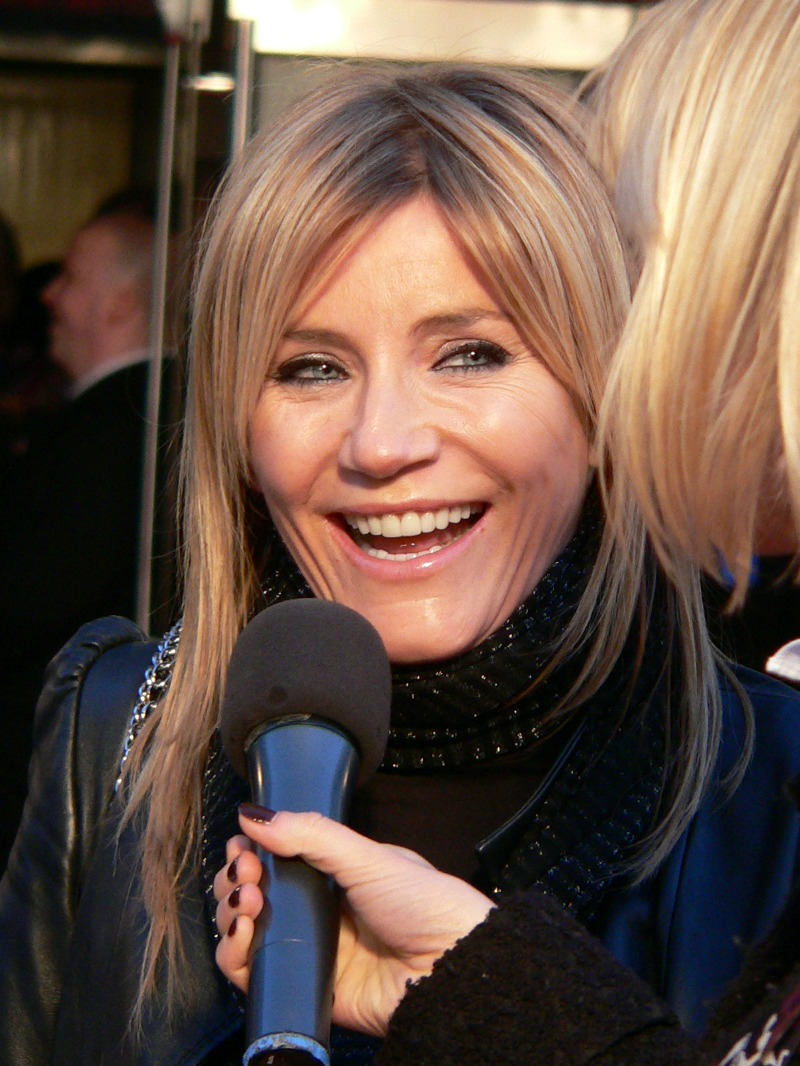
Michelle Collins (pictured) was hired to play Samantha Kellman, a love interest for Jeff Collier (Matt Bardock).

Samantha Kellman (originally Keeler), played by Michelle Collins, first appeared on 5 July 2014 as a patient and the new love interest for Jeff Collier (Matt Bardock). Collins made her last appearance as Samantha on 30 August 2014.

Collins has previously appeared in Casualty as Camille Lewis, the mother of a patient, Simone (Jayne Wisener), in series 25 for four episodes.

The character of Samantha and her casting was announced on 27 March 2014. It was announced she would joining in a guest stint and her first scenes would air in July. It was revealed that Samantha will end up in hospital after being injured while trying to help rescue a competitive father, who has a heart attack after a running race with his son and the character will also be a new love interest for paramedic Jeff, who treats her at the scene. The BBC said that as the romance with Jeff blossoms, a secret held by Samantha threatens to turn both of their worlds upside down.

Speaking about the part, Collins said: "I got offered the guest role in Casualty very soon after finishing Corrie. I jumped at the chance of playing a character so different so quickly – it was exciting to be stepping into something new. Playing Stella was great fun but it was thrilling to have a challenge of an entirely different role. Londoner Samantha is nothing like Stella – I dyed my hair to leave Stella behind which fitted in well with the role. I'm pleased to be involved in another hit drama TV show so soon, even if it's just for a short while. Since leaving Corrie it's been great to get my teeth into different characters and I'm looking forward to new opportunities which have been coming my way." Casualty's executive producer Oliver Kent added: "We can't wait for everyone to meet Samantha and see where her story goes over the two months she's on screen. Michelle has been absolutely brilliant and her arrival is set to have a huge impact on one of the show's most loved characters."

=== Val Kildare ===
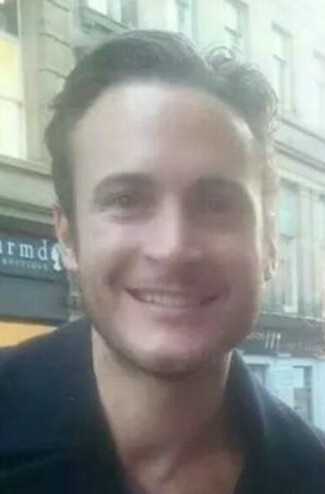
Accredited actor Gary Lucy (pictured) plays the character.

Valentine "Val" Kildare, played by accredited actor Gary Lucy, appeared in the tenth episode of series 29, which was originally broadcast on 15 November 2014. The episode was the first of three standalone episodes the show aired during the twenty-ninth series.

The casting was announced on 2 July 2014 that former EastEnders and Hollyoaks star, Gary Lucy, would be appearing in one of three upcoming standalone episodes that would air in November. Radio Times described the character as "a loveable rogue, born charmer and conman who exists very much on the wrong side of the tracks" and revealed that the episode, featuring Lucy, would revolve around a murder mystery. The show's series producer, Erika Hossington, announced that established character Lily Chao (Crystal Yu) would be the main character in the first standalone episode and that the episode would air on 1 November 2014, written by Jeff Povey. Hossington continued to talk about the episode's setting, "It's a great episode and it's all set at night. The hospital is empty, so it feels like a very ghostly place and that really feeds into the story that we're telling. It's brilliant and it feels very different." The character was not announced until the episode's cast list was revealed.

Yu revealed that herself and Amanda Henderson (who plays Robyn Miller) were very "giggly" whilst filming with Lucy, but she described him as a "wonderful" actor. Lucy also commented on his casting, stating: "I'm so pleased to be part of this fantastic stand-alone episode of Casualty. It's a well-written and directed piece with a strong set of regular characters. I had huge fun playing a different character in the longest running hospital drama. Tune in to watch the mystery unfold!" Spoiler pictures were released on 13 November that showed Lucy's scenes as Val. It was revealed that Val would be suspected of murder by Lily.

What's on TV described Val as "dodgy", "eye candy", "smooth-talking", and "shifty", while Digital Spy described him as "mysterious".

=== Luka Malinovsky ===
Luka Malinovsky, played by Tom Mulheron, made his first appearance in episode 20 of series 34, broadcast on 18 January 2020. Luka is the son of Lev Malinovsky (Uriel Emil) and Faith Cadogan (Kirsty Mitchell), who is diagnosed with a cancerous brain tumour that is close to his brain stem. He is booked in for a surgery performed by Zsa Zsa Harper-Jenkinson (Sharon Gless), but the surgery has to be cancelled due to Zsa Zsa finding more tumour in his brain.

=== Natalia Malinovsky ===
Natalia Malinovsky, played by Lollie McKenzie, made her first appearance in episode 20 of series 34, broadcast on 18 January 2020. Zoe Brough took over the role from the series 36 episode titled "Never Alone", which was broadcast on 28 May 2022.

=== Eddie McAllister ===
Eddie McAllister, played by Joe Gaminara, made his first appearance in episode 28 of series 32, broadcast on 17 March 2018. Eddie is an F1 doctor, who is billed as "ambitious" and "confident". Eddie happily allows others to be blamed for his mistakes, which happens to F1 doctor, Bea Kinsella (Michelle Fox). Eddie and Bea compete for a work placement on a "prestigious" course. He returns in episode 33, broadcast on 28 April 2018, as a regular character. Sophie Dainty of Digital Spy described Eddie as "a competitive, cocky posh boy – willing to do whatever it takes to climb the career ladder" and suggested that he could have a "darker side".

On 9 May 2018, it was announced that Eddie's first storyline would see him rape Alicia after a night of drinking with their colleagues. The storyline begins in May and continues for six weeks. Producers spoke with Rape Crisis England and Wales about the storyline and sought their guidance before developing the scripts for the episodes. Katie Russell, a spokesperson for Rape Crisis, explained that Eddie and Alicia's storyline explores the issue of consent "responsibly and carefully" and hoped that it could raise awareness for the issue. Simon Harper, the show's executive producer, thought it was important to portray a "tough, contemporary" storyline and praised the show's work on the story.

=== Ffion Morgan ===
Ffion Morgan, played by Stirling Gallacher, made her first appearance in episode 38 of series 34, broadcast on 18 July 2020. Ffion is a police officer, and the wife of Jan Jenning (Di Botcher). Gallacher's casting was announced on 3 February 2020. Gallacher expressed her excitement to appear in Casualty, and executive producer Simon Harper commented that he was "excited" to explore Ffion's character and to have Gallacher portraying her. He added that Ffion would be involved in "pretty turbulent" storylines. Originally set to make her debut in late spring, Ffion first appeared in July due to Casualty not being transmitted for over a month due to the effects of the COVID-19 pandemic.

=== Violette Spark ===
Violette Spark, portrayed by Kelly Gough, first appears in the sixteenth episode of series thirty-four, originally broadcast on 21 December 2019. The character and Gough's casting were announced on 26 November 2019. Violette is introduced as the estranged sister of paramedic Ruby Spark (Maddy Hill), who she shares "a rocky past" with. The character is introduced as part of the show's Christmas episodes, and her story was previewed in a trailer released on 6 December 2019. Violette is a heroin addict and growing up, Ruby watched her become addicted. Violette arrives pregnant, shocking Ruby, and soon gives birth to a daughter, Harmony, who becomes ill. Scared, Violette flees, leaving Ruby to care for Harmony. After overdosing, Violette is found by Ruby and agrees to receive treatment for her addiction. A show insider explained that Ruby believes that Harmony will be "enough to make Violette realise that she had to kick the habit for good". After leaving rehab, Violette moves in with Ruby and her housemate, Robyn Miller (Amanda Henderson), to raise Harmony.

Violette's addiction story was developed when she relapses. After seeing her ex-boyfriend Arlo Forrest (William Bliss), she accepts some drugs from him. When she awakens later, she ejects Arlo from the house and realises that Harmony is unwell. When Robyn informs Ruby that one of their neighbours saw Arlo leaving the house, Ruby calls Violette, suspicious that she has relapsed. Violette initially denies the claims, but becomes panicked about "listless and unresponsive" Harmony. Ruby demands that Violette brings Harmony to the hospital, but she refuses as she worries about being deemed "an unfit mother" by Social Services. Paediatric consultant Will Noble (Jack Nolan) speaks to Violette over the phone and suspects that Harmony has meningitis, which needs immediate treatment. Ruby then races to get Harmony to the hospital. Following her relapse, Violette returns to rehab but struggles with her physical and mental health. She tells Ruby about her back pain, but she dismisses it as withdrawal. Violette has a large aortic aneurysm and goes into cardiac arrest. Despite attempts to save her, Violette dies. This marks Gough's departure from the series and she makes her final appearance in the twenty-fifth episode of series thirty-four, originally broadcast on 22 February 2020.

Ammar Kalia of The Guardian included Violette's death in his television highlights for 22 February 2020. David Brown from the Radio Times called the twist "some rather grim drama". Tasha Hegarty from Digital Spy called the episode "emotionally-charged" and thought Violette's death created a "sad ending" to the story. A reporter from the Irish Mirror described her death as "harrowing" and "heartbreaking". The Metro's Calli Kitson thought that Violette's death was one of many stories contributing to "an emotional few weeks in Casualty". Sue Haasler, writing for the Metro, opined that Violette's story is "a desperately sad story of a life ruined by addiction". Reflecting on Ruby and Violette's relationship, Haasler wrote, "Violette and Ruby's relationship has been shown to be loving but always fraught with distrust and blame on both sides."

=== Glen Thomas ===
Glen Thomas, played by Owain Arthur, made his first appearance during the thirtieth series on 4 June 2016. Glen was introduced as a love interest for nurse Robyn Miller (Amanda Henderson). They meet at a bereavement support group, where Glen claims his wife died of a brain tumour. However, Glen later reveals that he has a glioblastoma, a malignant brain tumour, and did not want Robyn to date him out of pity. But she wants to be with him and they continue their relationship. Producers worked with the Brain Tumour Charity on the storyline. Arthur departed the serial in the thirty-first series episode "Night of the Loving Dead"after he jilted a devastated Robyn at the altar convinced she would be better off without him, broadcast on 22 October 2016. The actor reprised the role in 2017 and Glen returns in the thirteenth episode of series 32, broadcast on 18 November 2017. Arthur departed the series again in the thirtieth episode of series 32, broadcast on 31 March. Glen's departures sees him die on the day of his wedding after discovering his cancer has returned and he only has days to live.

=== Rich Walker ===
Rich Walker, played by Michael Keogh, made his first appearance in the thirty-eighth series episode titled "Sinking Ships – Day 2", originally broadcast on 15 June 2024. Keogh's introduction scenes were revealed in a promotional trailer for the series and works as a firefighters. Erin Zammitt from Digital Spy reported that Rich would share stories with Consultant Stevie Nash (Elinor Lawless) and their connection "threatens to burn them both".

In 2025, Stevie discovering Rich is married to Siobhan received a nomination in the Best Soap Storyline" category the Digital Spy Reader Awards.

=== Henry Williams ===
Professor Henry Williams, played by Tom Chadbon, first appeared on 13 September 2008, at the beginning of series 23. Henry is the hospital's Director of Critical Care and a consultant anaesthetist, who is in charge of the hospital's Emergency Department. He appointed Adam, though was quite sceptical about his ability to perform as the department's leader. Adam eventually stepped down as Lead Consultant and Clinical Lead in A&E as an Emergency Medicine Doctor and Physician.

=== Honey Wright ===
Honey Wright, portrayed by actress Chelsee Healey, first appears in the series twenty-nine episode "The Last Call", originally broadcast on 11 October 2014. The character and Healey's casting details were announced on 19 May 2014. The character is billed as a tea lady with "big hair and a big personality". Although she is based within the emergency department's (ED) coffee shop, Honey often travels around the ED with a tea trolley. Hossington liked this aspect of the character and compared her to Hayley Pearce in the documentary The Call Centre, saying that she "pops up everywhere". Writers created a secret for Honey upon her introduction, and she was revealed as the long-lost daughter of receptionist Noel Garcia (Tony Marshall). Producers paired Honey with registrar Ethan Hardy (George Rainsford), but the relationship is marred by Ethan's shyness and inference from Noel and Ethan's friend Lily Chao (Crystal Yu). Another story for the character involved her second job as a pole dancer. Healey had to pole dance for the scenes, which she initially found embarrassing. Honey leaves Holby to care for her grandmother, but returns five months later for a two-month stint. The stint focuses on Honey and Ethan's relationship and when they split, the character leaves Holby again. She makes her final appearance in the series thirty episode "Cradle to Grave", originally broadcast on 19 September 2015.

=== Amira Zafar ===
Amira Zafar, played by Poppy Jhakra, appeared on 27 August 2016. Amira appeared as a "tricky" agency nurse in the first episode of series 31, which celebrated the show's thirtieth anniversary. Jhakra revealed on 5 October 2016 that she had returned to filming for the show and would appear in episode 23 of series 31. She revealed two days later that she had finished filming. Despite Jhakra's statement, Amira appeared in episode 22, "You Are Your Only Limit". Jhakra revealed on 21 June 2017 that she would appear as Amira in Casualty's spin-off series, Holby City. Amira appeared in the nineteenth series from the episode titled "The Coming Storm", broadcast on 10 October 2017.

Amira arrives for an agency shift, and is rude to Charlie Fairhead (Derek Thompson), infuriating him. Max Walker (Jamie Davis) attempts to flirt with Amira, but she rejects him. When she attempts to apologise to Charlie, Amira is asked to leave the ED, but as she leaves, a helicopter crashes in the department's entrance. She treats Kai Swift (Raif Clark), despite the department being closed to all patients. Kai confesses to responsibility for the crash and Amira encourages him to confess. She leaves at the end of the shift, having impressed Charlie with her devotion to her work. Amira later appears at the disciplinary hearing of consultant Elle Gardner (Jaye Griffiths) to provide a statement about the care of Grace Beauchamp (Emily Carey) on the day she worked in the ED.

== See also ==
- List of Casualty characters

== Bibliography ==
- Kingsley, Hilary (1995). Casualty: The Inside Story. Penguin Books. ISBN 0-14-024902-8.
