= List of awards and nominations received by Casualty =

Casualty awards and nominations
Awards and nominations
Award	Wins	Nominations
British Academy Television Awards	7	20
Digital Spy Reader Awards	0	10
Inside Soap Awards	9	51
National Television Awards	1	59
Royal Television Society Awards	7	6
TRIC Awards	1	20
TV Quick and TV Choice Awards	1	18
Writers' Guild of Great Britain Awards	1	3
Other awards	5	10

Totals (Note: Certain award groups do not simply award one winner. They acknowledge several different recipients, have runners-up, and have third place. Since this is a specific recognition and is different from losing an award, runner-up mentions are considered wins in this award tally. For simplification and to avoid errors, each award in this list has been presumed to have had a prior nomination.)
- Wins: 42
- Nominations: 212

Casualty is a British medical drama series that airs weekly on BBC One. It is the longest-running emergency medical drama television series in the world, as well as the most enduring medical drama shown on prime time television in the world. Since its inception in 1986, Casualty has been nominated for a total of over 200 awards, and has won over 40 of these nominations. The following is a full list of these awards and nominations received by Casualty.

== British Academy Television Awards ==
The British Academy Television Awards are presented in an annual award show hosted by the BAFTA. They have been awarded annually since 1955.

Year	Category	Nominee	Result	Ref.
1988	Best Sound Supervisor	Rod Lewis	Nominated	
1991	Best VTR Editor	Nigel Cattle	Nominated	
1991	Best Video Lighting	Chris Watts	Nominated	
1991	Best VTR Editor	Malcolm Banthorpe	Won	
1992	Best Film or Video Editor (Fiction)	Alan Dixon	Nominated	
1992	Best Video Lighting	Cedric Rich	Nominated	
1992	Best Makeup	Sue Kneebone	Won	
1993	Best Drama Series	Casualty	Nominated	
1993	Best Make Up	Jan Nethercot	Nominated	
2004	Best Continuing Drama	Mal Young and Mervyn Watson	Nominated	
2006	Best Continuing Drama	Casualty	Nominated	
2007	Best Continuing Drama	Casualty	Won	
2009	Best Continuing Drama	Casualty	Nominated	
2010	Best Continuing Drama	Casualty	Nominated	
2011	Best Continuing Drama	Casualty	Nominated	
2014	Best Continuing Drama	Casualty	Nominated	
2015	Best Continuing Drama	Casualty	Nominated	
2017	Best Continuing Drama	Casualty	Nominated	
2018	Best Soap and Continuing Drama	Casualty	Won	
2019	Best Soap and Continuing Drama	Casualty	Nominated	
2020	Best Soap and Continuing Drama	Casualty	Nominated	
2021	Best Soap and Continuing Drama	Casualty	Won	
2022	Best Soap and Continuing Drama	Casualty	Nominated	
2023	Best Soap and Continuing Drama	Casualty	Won	
2024	Best Soap	Casualty	Won	
2025	Best Soap	Casualty	Nominated	
2026	Best Soap	Casualty	Nominated	

== Digital Spy Reader Awards ==
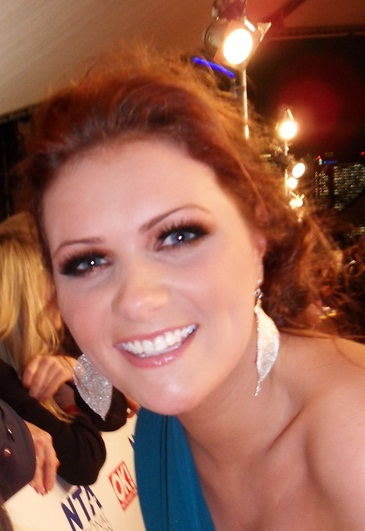
Chelsea Halfpenny (pictured), who portrayed Alicia Munroe, was nominated for Best Female Soap Actor in 2018.

The Digital Spy Reader Awards are an annual digital award ceremony ran by Digital Spy, voted for by readers of the website.

Year	Category	Nominee	Result	Ref.
2018	Best Soap (Evening)	Casualty	6th	
2018	Best Soap Actor (Female)	Chelsea Halfpenny (Alicia Munroe)	9th	
2018	Best Soap Actor (Male)	William Beck (Dylan Keogh)	9th	
2018	Best Soap Storyline	Alicia Munroe's rape	10th	
2018	Best Soap Couple	Charlie Fairhead and Lisa "Duffy" Duffin	10th	
2018	Biggest OMG Soap moment	Sam Nicholls' death	9th	
2018	Most devastating Soap Death	Sam Nicholls	9th	
2018	Best Soap Newcomer	Gabriella Leon (Jade Lovall)	12th	
2018	Best Soap Stunt	"The ambulance crash and motorway pile up"	5th	
2020	Most Devastating Death	Lisa "Duffy" Duffin	2nd	

== Inside Soap Awards ==
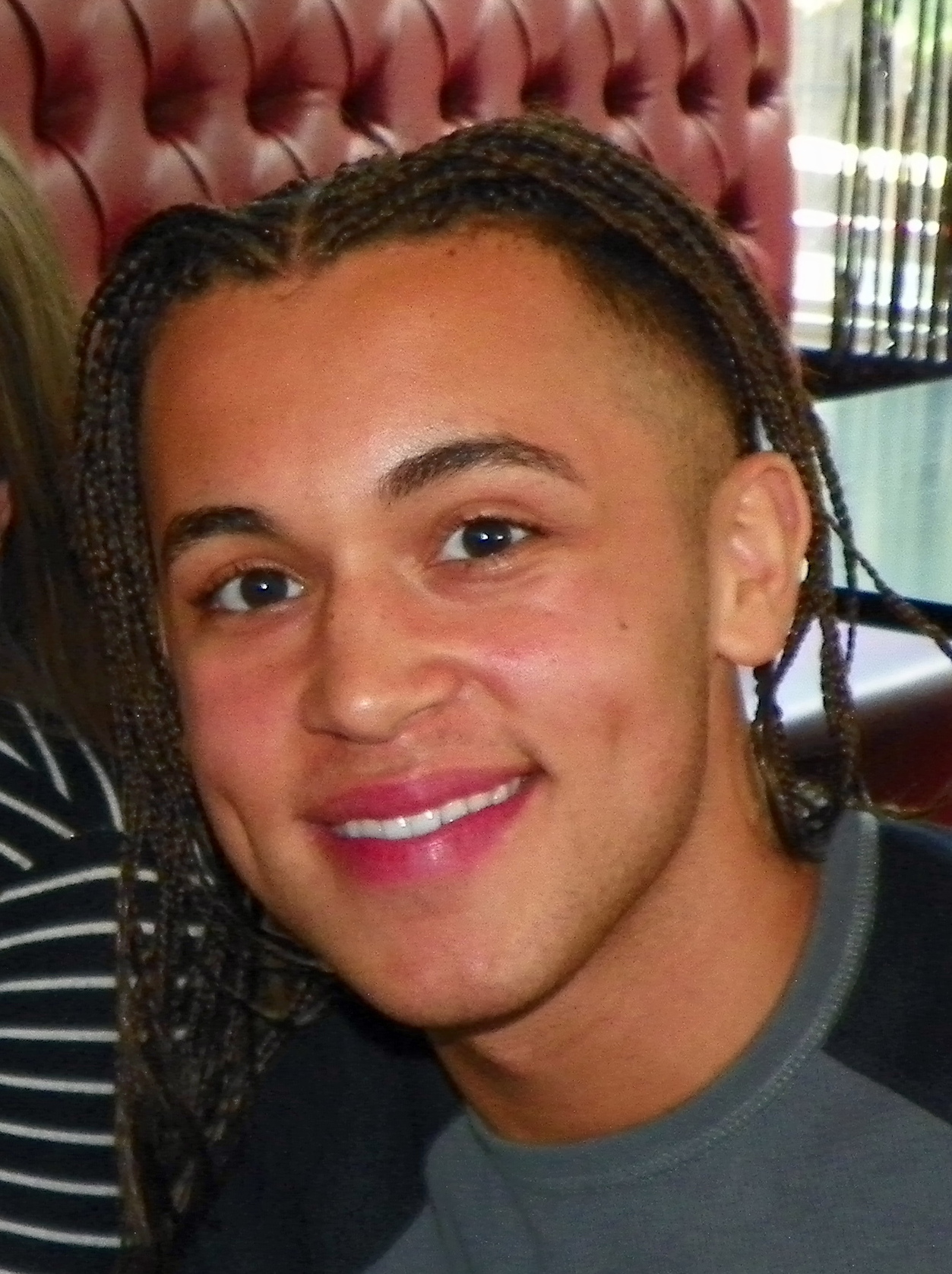
Shaheen Jafargholi (pictured), who portrays Marty Kirkby, was nominated for Best Drama Star in 2020.

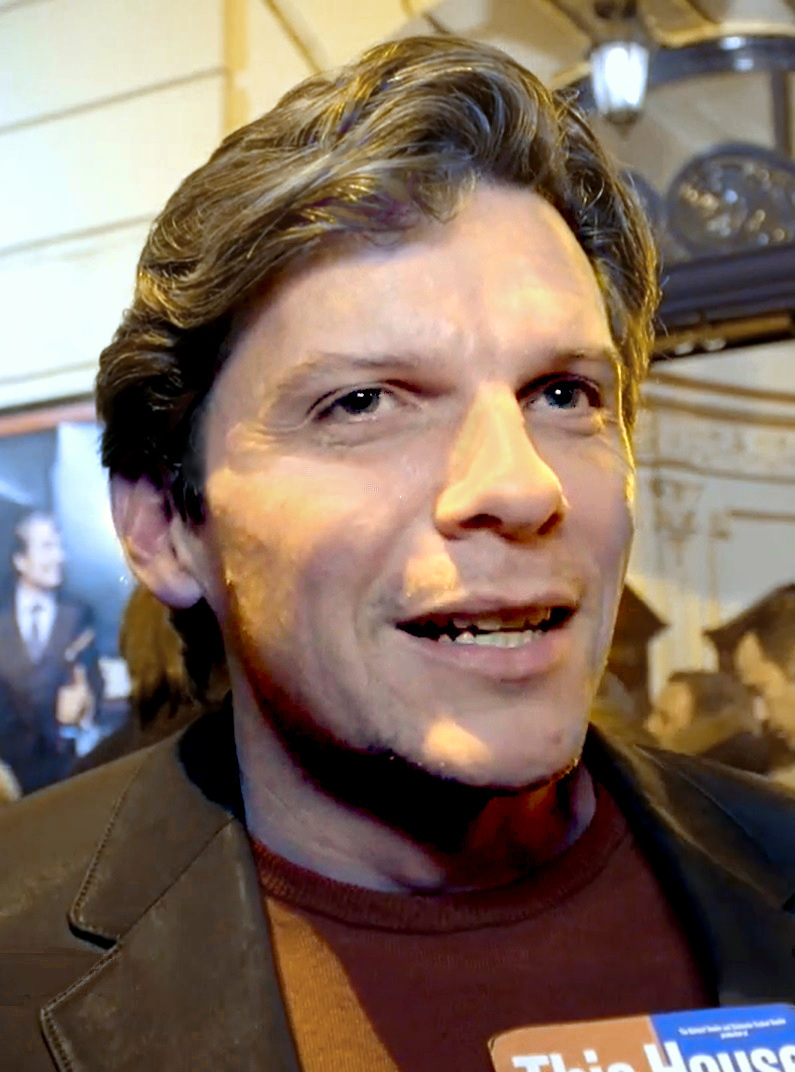
Nigel Harman (pictured), who portrays Max Cristie, won Best Drama Star in 2023.

The Inside Soap Awards are an annual award ceremony that has been run by Inside Soap since 2001.

Year	Category	Nominee	Result	Ref.
2007	Best Drama	Casualty	Nominated	
2008	Best Drama	Casualty	Nominated	
2009	Best Drama	Casualty	Nominated	
2010	Best Drama	Casualty	Nominated	
2011	Best Drama	Casualty	Nominated	
2012	Best Drama	Casualty	Nominated	
2013	Best Drama	Casualty	Nominated	
2014	Best Drama	Casualty	Nominated	
2015	Best Drama	Casualty	Won	
2016	Best Drama Star	Amanda Mealing (Connie Beauchamp)	Shortlisted	
2016	Best Drama Star	Sunetra Sarker (Zoe Hanna)	Longlisted	
2016	Best Drama Star	Derek Thompson (Charlie Fairhead)	Won	
2016	Best Drama Star	Richard Winsor (Caleb Knight)	Longlisted	
2016	Best Drama Storyline	"Charlie's near death experience"	Shortlisted	
2016	Best Drama Storyline	"Connie and Jacob's romance"	Longlisted	
2016	Best Drama Storyline	"Ethan and Cal meet their mum"	Shortlisted	
2017	Best Drama Star	Amanda Mealing (Connie Beauchamp)	Shortlisted	
2017	Best Drama Star	George Rainsford (Ethan Hardy)	Won	
2017	Best Drama Star	Cathy Shipton (Lisa "Duffy" Duffin)	Longlisted	
2017	Best Drama Star	Derek Thompson (Charlie Fairhead)	Shortlisted	
2017	Best Drama Storyline	"Cal's murder"	Shortlisted	
2017	Best Drama Storyline	"Charlie and Duffy's wedding"	Shortlisted	
2017	Best Drama Storyline	"Helicopter crash"	Won	
2018	Best Drama Star	William Beck (Dylan Keogh)	Shortlisted	
2018	Best Drama Star	Chelsea Halfpenny (Alicia Munroe)	Won	
2018	Best Drama Star	Amanda Mealing (Connie Beauchamp)	Shortlisted	
2018	Best Drama Star	George Rainsford (Ethan Hardy)	Longlisted	
2018	Best Drama Storyline	"Alicia's rape"	Shortlisted	
2018	Best Drama Storyline	"Connie's cancer"	Shortlisted	
2018	Best Drama Storyline	"Glen's death"	Longlisted	
2019	Best Drama Star	Amanda Mealing (Connie Beauchamp)	Shortlisted	
2019	Best Drama Star	Cathy Shipton (Lisa "Duffy" Duffin)	Longlisted	
2019	Best Drama Star	Michael Stevenson (Iain Dean)	Shortlisted	
2019	Best Drama Star	Charles Venn (Jacob Masters)	Longlisted	
2019	Best Drama Storyline	"Connie's PTSD"	Longlisted	
2019	Best Drama Storyline	"Duffy's dementia"	Shortlisted	
2019	Best Drama Storyline	"Iain's depression"	Won	
2020	Best Drama Star	Cathy Shipton (Lisa "Duffy" Duffin)	Won	
2020	Best Drama Star	Shaheen Jafargholi (Marty Kirkby)	Longlisted	
2020	Best Drama Star	Amanda Mealing (Connie Beauchamp)	Longlisted	
2020	Best Drama Star	Derek Thompson (Charlie Fairhead)	Shortlisted	
2021	Best Drama Star	Di Botcher (Jan Jennings)	Nominated	
2021	Best Drama Star	Amanda Mealing (Connie Beauchamp)	Nominated	
2021	Best Drama Star	George Rainsford (Ethan Hardy)	Nominated	
2021	Best Drama Star	Charles Venn (Jacob Masters)	Nominated	
2022	Best Drama Star	Jason Durr (David Hide)	Shortlisted	
2022	Best Drama Star	Elinor Lawless (Stevie Nash)	Shortlisted	
2022	Best Drama Star	Kirsty Mitchell (Faith Cadogan)	Longlisted	
2022	Best Drama Star	Neet Mohan (Rash Masum)	Longlisted	
2023	Best Drama Star	Nigel Harman (Max Cristie)	Won	
2023	Best Drama Star	Elinor Lawless (Stevie Nash)	Longlisted	
2023	Best Drama Star	Kirsty Mitchell (Faith Cadogan)	Longlisted	
2023	Best Drama Star	Charles Venn (Jacob Masters)	Shortlisted	
2024	Best Drama Star	Milo Clarke (Theodore "Teddy" Gowan)	Longlisted	
2024	Best Drama Star	Elinor Lawless (Stevie Nash)	Shortlisted	
2024	Best Drama Star	Neet Mohan (Rash Masum)	Shortlisted	
2024	Best Drama Star	Sarah Seggari (Rida Amaan)	Longlisted	
2025	Best Drama Star	Anna Chell (Jodie Whyte)	Longlisted	
2025	Best Drama Star	Sarah Seggari (Rida Amaan)	Longlisted	
2025	Best Drama Star	Michael Stevenson (Iain Dean)	Won	
2025	Best Drama Star	Barney Walsh (Cameron Mickelthwaite)	Shortlisted	

== National Television Awards ==
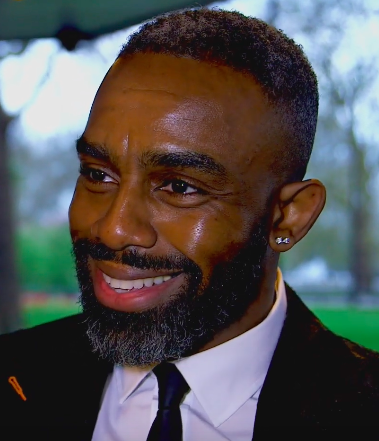
Charles Venn (pictured), who portrays Jacob Masters, was nominated for Newcomer in 2016.

The National Television Awards is an annual television awards ceremony broadcast by the ITV network from 1995.

Year	Category	Nominee	Result	Ref.
1995	Most Popular Drama	Casualty	Nominated	
1997	Most Popular Newcomer	Jonathan Kerrigan (Sam Colloby)	Nominated	
1998	Most Popular Newcomer	Claire Goose (Tina Seabrook)	Nominated	
2002	Most Popular Drama	Casualty	Nominated	
2005	Most Popular Newcomer	Elyes Gabel (Gurpreet "Guppy" Sandhu)	Nominated	
2008	Most Popular Newcomer	Georgia Taylor (Ruth Winters)	Nominated	
2010	Most Popular Drama	Casualty	Nominated	
2011	Most Popular Drama	Casualty	Longlisted	
2011	Most Popular Newcomer	Steven Miller (Lenny Lyons)	Longlisted	
2011	Outstanding Drama Performance	Georgia Taylor (Ruth Winters)	Longlisted	
2011	Outstanding Drama Performance	Michael French (Nick Jordan)	Longlisted	
2012	Most Popular Drama	Casualty	Longlisted	
2012	Most Popular Newcomer	William Beck (Dylan Keogh)	Longlisted	
2012	Outstanding Drama Performance (Female)	Georgia Taylor (Ruth Winters)	Longlisted	
2012	Outstanding Drama Performance (Male)	Ben Turner (Jay Faldren)	Longlisted	
2013	Most Popular Drama	Casualty	Longlisted	
2013	Most Popular Newcomer	Oliver Coleman (Tom Kent)	Longlisted	
2013	Outstanding Drama Performance (Female)	Sunetra Sarker (Zoe Hanna)	Longlisted	
2013	Outstanding Drama Performance (Male)	Michael French (Nick Jordan)	Longlisted	
2014	Drama	Casualty	Longlisted	
2014	Drama Performance	Suzanne Packer (Tess Bateman)	Longlisted	
2014	Drama Performance	Sunetra Sarker (Zoe Hanna)	Longlisted	
2014	Newcomer	Amanda Henderson (Robyn Miller)	Longlisted	
2015	Drama	Casualty	Longlisted	
2015	Drama Performance	Amanda Mealing (Connie Beaucham)	Longlisted	
2015	Drama Performance	Derek Thompson (Charlie Fairhead)	Longlisted	
2015	Newcomer	Lee Mead (Ben "Lofty" Chiltern)	Nominated	
2016	Drama Performance	Derek Thompson (Charlie Fairhead)	Longlisted	
2016	Newcomer	Chucky Venn (Jacob Masters)	Nominated	
2017	Drama	Casualty	Won	
2017	Drama Performance	Amanda Mealing (Connie Beauchamp)	Longlisted	
2017	Newcomer	Lloyd Everitt (Jez Andrews)	Nominated	
2018	Drama	Casualty	Nominated	
2018	Drama Performance	Amanda Mealing (Connie Beauchamp)	Longlisted	
2018	Drama Performance	George Rainsford (Ethan Hardy)	Longlisted	
2019	Drama	Casualty	Nominated	
2019	Drama Performance	Chelsea Halfpenny (Alicia Munroe)	Longlisted	
2019	Drama Performance	Michael Stevenson (Iain Dean)	Longlisted	
2019	Newcomer	Neet Mohan (Rash Masum)	Nominated	
2020	Drama	Casualty	Nominated	
2020	Drama Performance	Cathy Shipton (Lisa "Duffy" Duffin)	Longlisted	
2020	Drama Performance	Michael Stevenson (Iain Dean)	Nominated	
2020	Newcomer	Jack Nolan (Will Noble)	Nominated	
2021	Drama Performance	George Rainsford (Ethan Hardy)	Longlisted	
2021	Newcomer	Olivia D'Lima (Fenisha Khatri)	Nominated	
2021	Returning Drama	Casualty	Longlisted	
2022	Drama Performance	Charles Venn (Jacob Masters)	Longlisted	
2022	Returning Drama	Casualty	Longlisted	
2024	Serial Drama	Casualty	Nominated	
2024	Serial Drama Performance	Elinor Lawless (Stevie Nash)	Longlisted	
2024	Serial Drama Performance	Neet Mohan (Rash Masum)	Longlisted	
2024	Serial Drama Performance	Barney Walsh (Cameron Mickelthwaite)	Longlisted	
2025	Serial Drama	Casualty	Nominated	
2025	Serial Drama Performance	William Beck (Dylan Keogh)	Longlisted	
2025	Serial Drama Performance	Melanie Hill (Siobhan McKenzie)	Longlisted	
2025	Serial Drama Performance	Elinor Lawless (Stevie Nash)	Longlisted	
2025	Serial Drama Performance	Olly Rix (Flynn Byron)	Longlisted	
2025	Serial Drama Performance	Charles Venn (Jacob Masters)	Longlisted	
2025	Serial Drama Performance	Barney Walsh (Cameron Mickelthwaite)	Longlisted	
2026	Serial Drama	Casualty	Pending	
2026	Serial Drama Performance	William Beck (Dylan Keogh)	Pending	
2026	Serial Drama Performance	Milo Clarke (Theodore "Teddy" Gowan)	Pending	
2026	Serial Drama Performance	Melanie Hill (Siobhan McKenzie)	Pending	
2026	Serial Drama Performance	Olly Rix (Flynn Byron)	Pending	
2026	Serial Drama Performance	Charles Venn (Jacob Masters)	Pending	
2026	Serial Drama Performance	Barney Walsh (Cameron Mickelthwaite)	Pending	

== TRIC Awards ==
The TRIC Awards are an annual award ceremony held the Television and Radio Industries Club.

Year	Category	Nominee	Result	Ref.
2016	Special Award	Casualty	Won	
2021	Soap Actor of the Year	William Beck (Dylan Keogh)	Nominated	
2021	Soap Actor of the Year	Gabriella Leon (Jade Lovall)	Nominated	
2021	Soap Actor of the Year	Kirsty Mitchell (Faith Cadogan)	Nominated	
2021	Soap Actor of the Year	Derek Thompson (Charlie Fairhead)	Nominated	
2021	Soap of the Year	Casualty	Nominated	
2022	Soap Actor of the Year	Elinor Lawless (Stevie Nash)	Nominated	
2022	Soap Actor of the Year	Kirsty Mitchell (Faith Cadogan)	Nominated	
2022	Soap Actor of the Year	George Rainsford (Ethan Hardy)	Nominated	
2022	Soap Actor of the Year	Charles Venn (Jacob Masters)	Nominated	
2022	Soap of the Year	Casualty	Nominated	
2023	Soap Actor	Elinor Lawless (Stevie Nash)	Nominated	
2023	Soap Actor	Jason Durr (David Hide)	Nominated	
2023	Soap of the Year	Casualty	Nominated	
2024	Soap Actor	Derek Thompson (Charlie Fairhead)	Nominated	
2025	Soap Actor	Melanie Hill (Siobhan McKenzie)	Nominated	
2025	Soap Actor	Barney Walsh (Cameron Mickelthwaite)	Nominated	
2025	Soap of the Year	Casualty	Nominated	
2026	Soap Actor	Elinor Lawless (Stevie Nash)	Nominated	
2026	Soap Actor	Michael Stevenson (Iain Dean)	Nominated	
2026	Soap of the Year	Casualty	Nominated	

== TV Quick and TV Choice Awards ==
The TV Quick Awards were an annual award ceremony ran by TV Quick magazine. When the magazine ceased production, the awards were taken over by its sister magazine, TV Choice.

Year	Award	Category	Nominee	Result	Ref.
1999	TV Quick Awards	Best Loved Drama	Casualty	Won	
2011	TV Quick Awards	Best Family Drama	Casualty	Nominated	
2015	TV Choice Awards	Best Family Drama	Casualty	Nominated	
2016	TV Choice Awards	Best Family Drama	Casualty	Nominated	
2017	TV Choice Awards	Best Actor	George Rainsford (Ethan Hardy)	Nominated	
2017	TV Choice Awards	Best Actress	Amanda Mealing (Connie Beauchamp)	Nominated	
2017	TV Choice Awards	Best Family Drama	Casualty	Nominated	
2018	TV Choice Awards	Best Family Drama	Casualty	Nominated	
2018	TV Choice Awards	Best Actor	William Beck (Dylan Keogh)	Nominated	
2019	TV Choice Awards	Best Family Drama	Casualty	Nominated	
2020	TV Choice Awards	Best Family Drama	Casualty	Nominated	
2021	TV Choice Awards	Best Family Drama	Casualty	Nominated	
2022	TV Choice Awards	Best Family Drama	Casualty	Nominated	
2023	TV Choice Awards	Best Family Drama	Casualty	Nominated	
2024	TV Choice Awards	Best Family Drama	Casualty	Nominated	
2025	TV Choice Awards	Best Family Drama	Casualty	Nominated	
2026	TV Choice Awards	Best Family Drama	Casualty	Nominated	
2026	TV Choice Awards	Best Drama Performance	William Beck (Dylan Keogh)	Nominated	
2027	TV Choice Awards	Best Drama Series	Casualty	Nominated	

== RTS Awards ==
The Royal Television Society Awards are a set of annual award ceremonies ran by the Royal Television Society.

Year	Category	Nominee	Result	Ref.
1992	Best Drama Series	Casualty	Won	
1998	Best Sound – Drama	Colin Solloway and Nigel Abbott	Won	
2010	Best Soap and Continuing Drama	Casualty	Nominated	
2011	Best Soap and Continuing Drama	Casualty	Nominated	
2014	Soap and Continuing Drama	Casualty	Nominated	
2015	Soap and Continuing Drama	Casualty	Won	
2019	Soap and Continuing Drama	Casualty	Nominated	
2020	Soap and Continuing Drama	Casualty	Won	
2021	Soap and Continuing Drama	Casualty	Won	
2022	Soap and Continuing Drama	Casualty	Nominated	
2023	Soap and Continuing Drama	Casualty	Won	
2024	Soap and Continuing Drama	Casualty	Nominated	
2025	Soap and Continuing Drama	Casualty	Won	

== Writers' Guild of Great Britain Awards ==
The Writers' Guild of Great Britain Awards are an annual award ceremony ran by the Writers' Guild of Great Britain.

Year	Category	Nominee	Result	Ref.
1996	TV – Original Drama Series	David Joss Buckley	Nominated	
2011	Best Continuing Drama	Dana Fainaru	Won	
2012	Best Continuing Drama	Sasha Hails	Nominated	
2019	Best Long Running TV Series	Barbara Machin	Nominated	

== Other awards and accolades ==
Year	Award	Category	Nominee	Result	Ref.
2011	Stonewall Awards	Entertainer of the Year	Jane Hazlegrove (Dixie Dixon)	Won	
2012	Creative Diversity Network Awards	The Radio Times Soap Award	Episode: "#HolbyRiot – Part 1", 21 July 2012	Nominated	
2014	UK Sexual Health Awards	Sexual health media campaign/storyline of the year	Episode: "Unsilenced", 13 April 2013	Won	
2015	Albert Sustainable Production Certification	Three Stars	Casualty	Won	
2015	Black International Film Festival and Music Video & Screen Awards	Best Actor	Tony Marshall (Noel Garcia)	Nominated	
2015	Black International Film Festival and Music Video & Screen Awards	Best Long Running Drama	Casualty	Nominated	
2016	BAFTA Cymru	Best Actress	Amanda Mealing (Connie Beauchamp)	Nominated	
2016	Screen Nation Film and Television Awards	Favourite Male TV Personality	Charles Venn (Jacob Masters)	Won	
2018	BAFTA Cymru	Best Actress	Amanda Mealing (Connie Beauchamp)	Nominated	
2018	Broadcast Awards	Best Soap/Continuing Drama	Casualty	Nominated	
2020	TV Times Awards	Favourite Drama	Casualty	Nominated	
2021	TV Times Awards	Favourite Actress	Amanda Mealing (Connie Beauchamp)	Nominated	
2021	TV Times Awards	Favourite Drama	Casualty	Nominated	
2023	Broadcast Awards	Best Soap/Continuing Drama	Casualty	Nominated	
2024	Broadcast Awards	Best Soap/Continuing Drama	Casualty	Won	
