= Casualty series 34 =

Thirty-fourth series of Casualty

Casualty
- Series 34
- Starring: William Beck; Di Botcher; Olivia D'Lima; Jason Durr; Uriel Emil; Amanda Henderson; Maddy Hill; Shaheen Jafargholi; Gabriella Leon; Genesis Lynea; Tony Marshall; Amanda Mealing; Kirsty Mitchell; Neet Mohan; Jack Nolan; Victor Oshin; George Rainsford; Jacey Sallés; Michael Stevenson; Cathy Shipton; Derek Thompson; Charles Venn
- No. of episodes: 43

Release
- Original network: BBC One; BBC One HD
- Original release: 17 August 2019 – 26 September 2020

Series chronology
- ← Previous; Series 33 Next → Series 35

The thirty-fourth series of the British medical drama television series Casualty commenced airing in the United Kingdom on BBC One on 17 August 2019, one week after the end of the previous series and finished on 26 September 2020. The series consists of 43 episodes.

Lucy Raffety continues her role as series producer, while Simon Harper continues his role as the show's executive producer; this is Raffety's final series as producer, and she was replaced by Loretta Preece. Production on the series was postponed in March 2020 due to the COVID-19 pandemic, which also resulted in multiple transmission breaks. A single episode was also pulled due to comparisons between its content and the pandemic; the episode was broadcast as the final episode of the series at a later date. The theme of the series is reflecting how the National Health Service (NHS) is "under pressure", with elements focusing on "the hierarchy of pressure on the doctors". The series is also promoted through multiple trailers.

Sixteen regular cast members reprised their roles from the previous series and five actors joined the cast. Additionally, Neet Mohan reprised his role as Rash Masum in the opening episode and Amanda Mealing returned to her role as Connie Beauchamp in episode 18 after a break from the series. Four cast members departed the show during the series, including original cast member Cathy Shipton (Lisa "Duffy" Duffin). Jane Hazlegrove reprised her role as Kathleen "Dixie" Dixon for two episodes and American actress Sharon Gless appeared as her recurring character, Zsa Zsa Harper-Jenkinson.

== Production ==
The thirty-fourth series consists of 43 episodes. Lucy Raffety continues her role as series producer while Simon Harper remains as the executive producer. Raffety's resignation from her position was announced on 16 April 2019, and she was replaced by Loretta Preece. Raffety and Preece were co-credited as series producer from episode 5, and Raffety confirmed that her stories would be broadcast until December.

Raffety previewed the series in an interview with Elaine Reilly of What's on TV, where she confirmed the theme of the series is "The NHS Under Pressure" and how the staff are working in a struggling environment. Harper echoed this, stating that the theme would be about "an NHS at critical breaking point". Preece also told Sophie Dainty of Digital Spy that the series would follow "the hierarchy of pressure on the doctors", in particular junior doctors such as Rash and Mason. Raffety told Reilly that the series would feature new stories for Dylan, Ethan and David, while Preece mentioned that Rash would experience a "moving journey" during the series. She also divulged that the series would also explore whether the NHS would be able to help Charlie and Duffy after they have "invested their whole adult lives" into the service. Preece stated that her plans for Casualty included "contemporary" guest artist stories and more comedy in the ED, while also creating more "action and drama".

It was announced on 18 March 2020 that production had been suspended on Casualty and other BBC Studios continuing dramas in light of government guidelines following the COVID-19 pandemic. A BBC Studios statement confirmed that there would be no impact on the immediate broadcast of episodes, but the "long-term ramifications are still unclear". The programme's Twitter account confirmed that episodes would broadcast for "as long as [they] can". An episode, which was planned to be episode 33 of the series and broadcast on 2 May 2020, was pulled from airing after being deemed "inappropriate" because of the pandemic. The following episode was brought forward to air in the slot. The pulled episode features the ED team dealing with a viral outbreak; scenes considered important to storylines were included in the catch-up section of the aired episode. Episode 42, which is the final episode filmed before production was suspended, was broadcast on 22 August 2020. Following this, the show entered a transmission break. It was announced on 16 September 2020 that the pulled episode would be broadcast as episode 43 on 26 September. Kate Oates, the head of continuing drama at BBC Studios, said that she was "proud" of the episode and "excited" to broadcast it and watch "the whole ED come together to tackle an invisible threat". Production of Casualty resumed in September 2020, but episodes recommenced with series 35.

=== Promotion ===
The series was promoted through multiple trailers and each episode received a preview clip before broadcast. A trailer for the series was released on 14 August 2019, three days before the series premiere. It features segments from the early episodes of the series and Caitlin Butler of Digital Spy named the returns of Dixie and Rash, and a "tragic" story involving David and Oliver as highlights.

== Cast ==
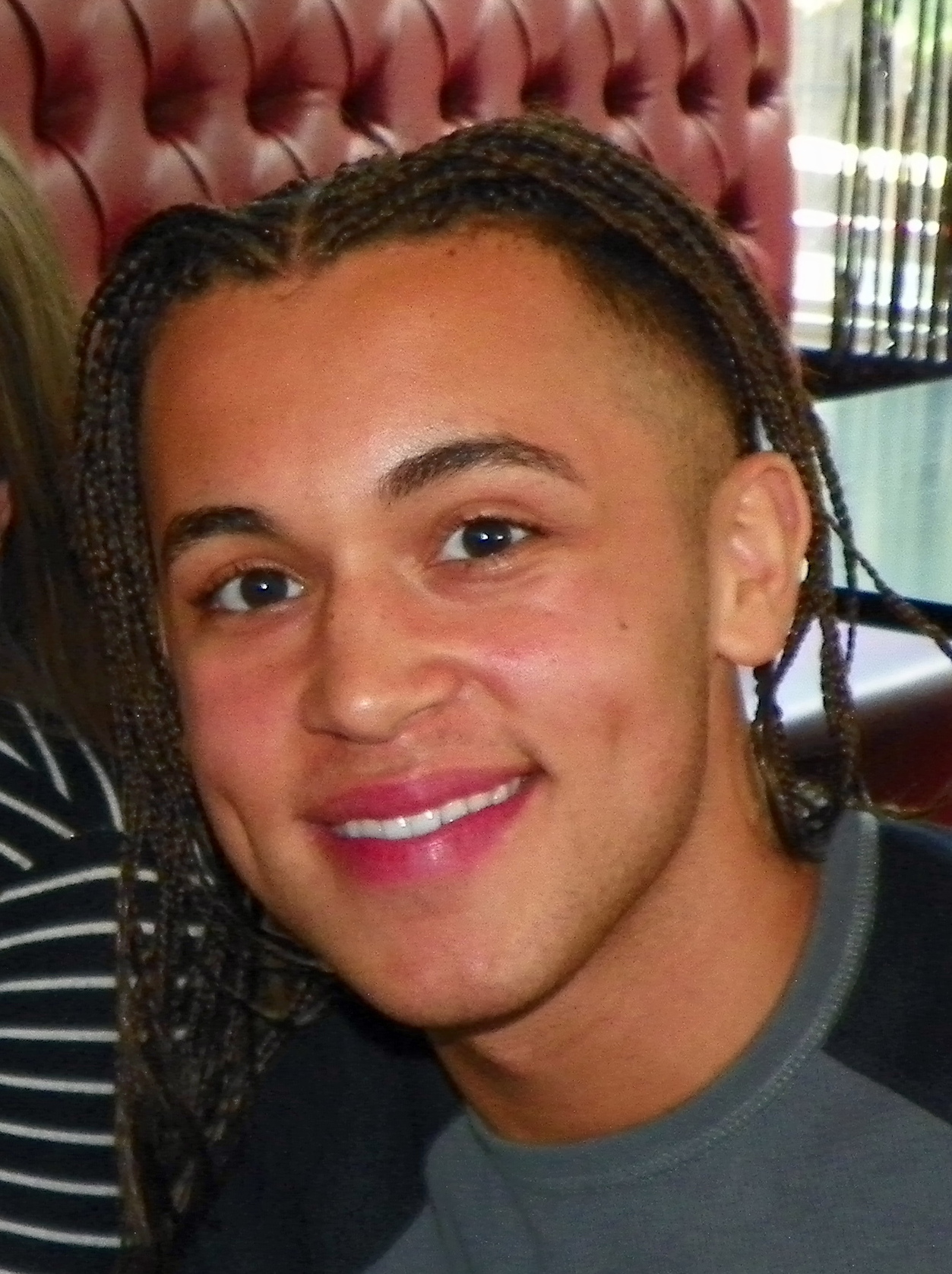
Shaheen Jafargholi appears in the series as nurse Marty Kirkby.

The thirty-fourth series of Casualty features a cast of characters working in the emergency department of Holby City Hospital. The majority of the cast from the previous series continue to appear in this series. William Beck and George Rainsford appear as Dylan Keogh and Ethan Hardy, both consultants in emergency medicine. Jack Nolan portrays Will Noble, a consultant in pediatric emergency medicine, and Genesis Lynea features as Archie Hudson, an emergency medicine registrar. Longest-serving cast member Derek Thompson stars as Charlie Fairhead, the department's clinical nurse manager, senior charge nurse and emergency nurse practitioner, and Charles Venn portrays Jacob Masters, a charge nurse. The cast portraying the department's staff nurses are: Amanda Henderson (Robyn Miller, Jason Durr (David Hide), Gabriella Leon (Jade Lovall) and Shaheen Jafargholi (Marty Kirkby). Michael Stevenson and Maddy Hill play Iain Dean and Ruby Spark, both paramedics. Di Botcher plays operational duty manager and paramedic Jan Jenning, and Tony Marshall appears as Noel Garcia, the ED receptionist. Jacey Sallés portrays hospital porter Rosa Cadenas and Cathy Shipton stars as non-practicing senior sister and nursing assistant Duffy.

In May 2019, it was confirmed that Stevenson had finished filming and would be leaving the series. The actor expressed his pleasure at portraying Iain. Harper said he was "proud" of the actor's work on the show. Despite the departure originally being publicised as a break, Stevenson confirmed that he had left the cast, but the character was not killed off and could return. His final scenes were broadcast in episode 5. Shipton's departure from the show was announced on 9 October 2019, her final day of filming. The character was reported to leave at the conclusion of her dementia story. Shipton expressed her sadness at leaving and commented, "With sadness, but a sense of completion, I say goodbye." Harper praised Shipton for making Duffy "a comforting Saturday night icon, the caring, ideal NHS nurse millions grew up with". Shipton did not plan to stay for a long stint when she returned in series 31, and confirmed that the plot, which had been developing for two years, suited her decision not to stay. The character is killed off in episode 22. On killing-off the character, Harper said that he was proud to have "shone the most powerful light on a cruel disease". Rainsford confirmed on 20 November 2019 that he would be taking a short break from the drama; Ethan departs for a volunteer post in Costa Rica in episode 17. Rainsford explained that the timing of Ethan's departure was poor, but Ethan decides that "his needs [are] greater" and takes a break from the hospital to "clear his head". The character returns in episode 24 and receives a hostile response from Rash, which Rainsford confirmed is related to the series' theme. Lynea quit her role as Archie after a year on the drama and the character made her exit in episode 27. Her departure was not publicised prior to broadcast. After two years of appearing in the programme, Hill announced her departure from her role as Ruby in April 2020. Her final scenes aired in the thirty-first episode.

Neet Mohan returned to the drama in the opening episode, portraying Rash Masum, a foundation doctor, after a four-month break during the previous series. Actress Amanda Mealing also took a break from her role as consultant Connie Beauchamp during the previous series and will return during series 34. Her return airs in episode 18. On 7 August 2019, it was announced that Jane Hazlegrove would reprise her role as Kathleen "Dixie" Dixon for two episodes in the series as part of Iain's exit story. Dixie, a former paramedic and operational duty manager, returns as a Helicopter Emergency Medical Service paramedic. Harper expressed his delight at Dixie's return and called her "a massively popular character with the audience". The character appears in episodes 4 and 5.

Victor Oshin was cast as "over-confident" F1 doctor Mason Reede for the new series, and he is introduced in episode 2. Oshin was a regular cast member. Harper was impressed with Oshin from his first audition and praised the actor's performance, commenting, "He's brilliant as Mason, layering the character with a deep vulnerability beneath the bravado of a junior Doctor." Episode 18 features Oshin's exit from the drama as his character is killed off in an unannounced twist. The casting of Uriel Emil as Russian paramedic Lev Malinovsky was announced on 2 September 2019. The character, who is billed as "steely and tough but gentle at heart", is introduced as Iain's replacement and features in a big story during the series. Emil expressed his excitement at joining the cast. Harper described Lev as "fresh and unique" and commented that Emil portrayed the "troubled" Lev with "a fantastic, exciting energy". Producers then introduced advanced clinical practitioner (ACP) Faith Cadogan (Kirsty Mitchell), who was revealed to be Lev's wife, in episode 17. The characters feature in a new story when their son Luka Malinovsky (Tom Mulheron), who is introduced to the series, is diagnosed with a brain tumour. On 3 February 2020, it was announced that Stirling Gallacher had joined the cast as Ffion Morgan, a police officer and the wife of Jan. Gallacher expressed her delight at joining the cast and Harper stated that he was "excited" to explore the character and to have Gallacher portraying her. He confirmed that Ffion would be involved in "pretty turbulent" storylines. Fenisha Khatri (Olivia D'Lima) appears in episode 25 as a love interest for Ethan. She returns in episode 28 as a new paramedic, billed as "spirited, enthusiastic and brave".

The series features several recurring characters and multiple guest stars. Episode one features the return of David's son, Oliver Hide (Harry Collett), and former wife, Rosalene Hide (Lorraine Pilkington), as well as the first appearance of Kriss Dosanjh as Rash's father, Ashok Masum. The third episode of the series features an appearance from Rosie Marcel as Jac Naylor, a character in Casualty's spin-off series, Holby City. Established actress Abigail Hardingham was cast in the series as guest character Effie Laurence, a love interest for Ethan. Effie is the daughter of Ethan's university friend, Theo Laurence (Jim Sturgeon), and has cystic fibrosis. Rainsford noted that the relationship would not be "without its issues as well". Hardingham and Sturgeon made their first appearances in episode two, and departed in episode 12 and 11, respectively. In November 2019, it was announced that actress Anna Savva had been cast to play Rosa's mother, Xiomara. Sallés described the character as "absolutely fabulous – but she's very meddlesome". The actress confirmed that Xiomara would arrive to put pressure on Rosa and David's relationship and soon befriends Ollie, who joins her in trying to get the pair married. That same month, a clip for Children in Need that was filmed by cast members teased the return of American actress Sharon Gless as Zsa Zsa Harper-Jenkinson, who has made three previous appearances on the drama. Her return was confirmed on 30 January 2020 by TVTimes, who reported that Dylan would call Zsa Zsa for help with Luka's brain tumour. Zsa Zsa makes a cameo appearance in episode 25, before guest starring in episode 26. Gless admitted that she did not expect to be invited back again as the timings were different to previous stints, so was pleased when the producers asked her. Kelly Gough was cast in a recurring role as Ruby's sister, Violette Spark, who was introduced in episode 16 for a new story for Ruby. Gough's stint on the drama ends in episode 25 when her character is killed off. As part of Duffy's story, actor Clive Wood reprised his role as Bill Crowthers, having appeared across five episodes in the previous series. Bill appears in episode 20. Episode 29 features an appearance from Alex Walkinshaw as director of nursing Adrian "Fletch" Fletcher, a character in Holby City. Also, Mealing confirmed that Jo Martin would appear as Max McGerry, a consultant in neurosurgery and the acting chief executive officer.

=== Main characters ===
- William Beck as Dylan Keogh
- Di Botcher as Jan Jenning
- Olivia D'Lima as Fenisha Khatri (from episode 25)
- Jason Durr as David Hide
- Uriel Emil as Lev Malinovsky (from episode 6)
- Amanda Henderson as Robyn Miller
- Maddy Hill as Ruby Spark (until episode 31)
- Shaheen Jafargholi as Marty Kirkby
- Gabriella Leon as Jade Lovall
- Genesis Lynea as Archie Hudson (until episode 27)
- Tony Marshall as Noel Garcia
- Amanda Mealing as Connie Beauchamp (from episode 18)
- Kirsty Mitchell as Faith Cadogan (from episode 17)
- Neet Mohan as Rash Masum (from episode 1)
- Jack Nolan as Will Noble
- Victor Oshin as Mason Reede (episodes 2−17)
- George Rainsford as Ethan Hardy
- Jacey Sallés as Rosa Cadenas
- Cathy Shipton as Lisa "Duffy" Duffin (until episode 22)
- Michael Stevenson as Iain Dean (until episode 5)
- Derek Thompson as Charlie Fairhead
- Charles Venn as Jacob Masters

=== Recurring characters ===
- Harry Collett as Oliver Hide
- Stirling Gallacher as Ffion Morgan
- Kelly Gough as Violette Spark
- Abigail Hardingham as Effie Laurence
- Tom Mulheron as Luka Malinovsky
- Jim Sturgeon as Theo Laurence

=== Guest characters ===
- Kriss Dosanjh as Ashok Masum
- Sharon Gless as Zsa Zsa Harper-Jenkinson
- Jane Hazlegrove as Kathleen "Dixie" Dixon
- Rosie Marcel as Jac Naylor
- Jo Martin as Max McGerry
- Lorraine Pilkington as Rosalene Hide
- Anna Savva as Xiomara Steadman
- Alex Walkinshaw as Adrian "Fletch" Fletcher
- Clive Wood as Bill Crowthers

== Episodes ==
No. overall	No. in series	Episode	Directed by	Written by	Original release date	UK viewers (millions)
1140	1	Episode 1	Steve Brett	Mark Catley	17 August 2019	4.93
Rash returns to Holby, following the death of his mother. After learning that there has been a potential terrorist attack at a market, he leaves the mosque to help out in the ED. Ethan goes to the scene with the advanced trauma team, where he assists in the extraction of a father and daughter pinned by a van. An explosive device detonates, trapping Ethan and his colleague Al under rubble. Meanwhile, Dylan has been appointed Acting Clinical Lead, while Connie takes a leave of absence, and David's son Ollie comes to the ED unannounced.
1141	2	Episode 2	Steve Brett	Rebecca Wojciechowski	24 August 2019	4.80
Mason Reede, a confident new F1 doctor, begins his first shift in the ED. Rash decides to delay his return to work, but when he visits the ED, a young mother asks for his help with her ill daughter and he stays. Rash is assigned as Mason's mentor, and leaves him with the mother when Ashok arrives at the hospital. Mason expresses his feelings about his shift to Rash, who vows that as F1 doctors, they must support each other. However, Mason then complains about Rash to Dylan. Ethan has been working since the accident and is told that he must return home. Ethan's university friend, Theo, visits with his daughter Effie, who has cystic fibrosis, and asks Ethan for his help in getting her onto the hospital's trial. Effie confides in Ethan about her poor condition and asks Ethan to lie to her father; when she coughs up blood, Theo discovers the truth and they learn she is ineligible for the trial. Duffy struggles at home alone and confides in Charlie that she wants a job to keep her occupied.
1142	3	Episode 3	Fiona Walton	Debbie Owen	31 August 2019	4.59
Duffy begins volunteering at a care home for dementia sufferers, and while she is not looking, Maisie, an elderly lady, falls from her chair. When taken to hospital, Duffy suggests that in order to treat Maisie without sedating her, she gives her a doll to distract her; it is successful. Duffy discovers grade three pressure sores on Maisie. Oliver goes missing, and when David finds him, he is sat on a bridge. While on the phone to Dylan, Oliver loses grip and falls into the water. David asks Dylan to send for an ambulance, then jumps in to save him. Oliver becomes unconscious, and after resuscitations and defibrillating, he regains consciousness. Rosalene arrives, furious with David. Due to the damage on his sternum from heart compressions, Jac and Dylan perform an open surgery on Oliver, which is successful. When he awakens, he expresses that he wants to live with David permanently. While Ethan is assisting Mason, he receives a call about the cystic fibrosis trial. Left alone with a patient, Mason attempts to perform a clinical task, but causes pain to the patient. Archie takes over, and Ethan insists that he should have waited.
1143	4	Episode 4	Fiona Walton	Johanne McAndrew and Elliot Hope	7 September 2019	5.05
Jade brings in Vincent, a patient with chemical burns, which Archie assists with, while Will treats the assailant, Seb. Archie sees a burn down the arm of Seb, and tests it, finding out that it is an acid burn. When Archie asks Seb what happened, he reveals that Vincent was a former teacher who abused Seb and his friends. Archie helps Seb to pass security, but he is caught by the police anyway; Will begins to suspect that Archie helped him and destroyed Vincent's car. After seeing Dixie on a callout, she tells Iain that she is working as a temporary replacement for a paramedic. They go for a drink together, and catch up on events such as Sam's death. When a patient displays symptoms of a hangover, Mason suggests they discharge her from the hospital, while Rash believes the patient could be displaying signs of a subarachnoid hemorrhage. Mason makes a bet with Rash over what the patient is suffering from, with Rash's bike as the wager. The patient is revealed to have a hangover after tests and scans, and Rash is forced to give his bike to Mason.
1144	5	Episode 5	Paul Riordan	Hamish Wright and Dana Fainaru	21 September 2019	5.21
Rash leaves Gem a voicemail, and when Mason overhears, he mocks Rash. When a patient is admitted and taken in for an X-ray, Mason unknowingly shows Rash the wrong X-ray scan. When asked what happened by Dylan, Mason lies and claims that Rash missed the fracture in the scan. Iain tells Jan and Ruby that he's applying for a job at HEMS, where Dixie works. Dixie insists that Iain will not be able to handle the job requirements, due to the events of the past year. Iain convinces the paramedic team that he is ready, and leaves for HEMS with Dixie.
1145	6	Episode 6	Paul Riordan	Julie Dixon and Mark Catley	28 September 2019	5.20
Jan and Ruby find new paramedic, Lev, fighting with a hooded man trying to throw a kitten into a bin. Lev brings the kitten into the paramedic base, setting off Ruby's allergies. When David is leaving for work, Rosa arrives after Oliver invites her over. The pair go on a walk, where Rosa is knocked over by a couple on electric scooters. Rosa is taken into the hospital, where it is revealed that her landlord is ending her tenancy agreement, leaving her with nowhere to stay. David agrees to let Rosa stay with him and Oliver, giving her a key to his house. As a gift, Rosa adopts the kitten that Lev found for the house. When Mason fails to notice a patient with signs of low potassium, he asks Rash for help. Rash takes control of the patient, as Mason is unsure of what to do. Ethan praises Rash for his work, leaving Mason disgruntled.
1146	7	Episode 7	Matt Hilton	Rachel Paterson	5 October 2019	5.10
While doing a femoral line on a patient, Dylan asks Mason to help out, but to his annoyance, Mason cannot locate the correct place, and sends him away. Ethan informs Mason that a patient made a complaint about him. Later in the week, another patient threatens to make a complaint after Mason does not ask for consent to assess her, and does not ask if she's pregnant before an X-ray, but later chooses not to after he gives the patient personal care. While treating an elderly patient, he forgets to run a test for blood clots; the patient is later readmitted and dies due to cardiac arrest. Rash checks over the notes, and realises the mistake Mason made. David receives a living arrangement order which claims that Oliver must live with his mother. Rosa confronts David, and encourages him to fight for Oliver to continue living with him. Effie visits Ethan at the hospital, and asks for his advice on whether she should take part in the trial or not; he advices her that she needs to make her own decision.
1147	8	Episode 8	Matt Hilton	Colin Bytheway	12 October 2019	5.11
While driving her car, Duffy forgets how to turn right, and begins to panic. She calls Charlie, and he takes her into the hospital to be checked over. Effie shows up at the hospital looking for Ethan, and asks him out to a yacht party. He accepts, and tells Dylan he is feeling unwell; however, a patient with an aneurism comes in, leaving Ethan at work and Effie waiting for him. The patient, Marcus, is revealed to be a convicted child murderer, to which Robyn expresses discomfort treating him. The mother of the murdered child gets herself admitted onto the ward, and takes Marcus' daughter and holds a knife to her throat. Duffy manages to talk her out of hurting her, and takes her into the relatives room. As a result of her successfully persuading the patient, Dylan offers Duffy a position as a part-time hospital volunteer. Ethan apologises to Effie and agrees to have dinner with her. As he is leaving, Theo turns up, and tells Ethan to stay away from his daughter.
1148	9	Episode 9	Steve Hughes	Sumerah Srivastav and Colin Bytheway	19 October 2019	5.02
Vincent is readmitted to Holby alongside his grandson Joshua, making Archie feel unsettled. Vincent begins to feel unsafe on the ward, so he attempts to escape from the hospital. Archie finds him on the outdoor steps, where she confesses to him that she vandalised his car. He begins to have problems with his heart, and is resuscitated. He tells Archie that he is going to report her to the police, and she breaks down in the bathroom. However, Vincent changes his mind and decides not to report Archie. Rash reaffirms to Mason that he needs to face the consequences of not testing for blood clots, but Mason says that he is not going to come forward. After Mason promises to not make another mistake, Rash reveals he will not tell Ethan about his prior errors. Theo tells Ethan to find out whether Effie is in the placebo group of the trial or not, but when he asks the trial leader, she explains that the trial is double blinded. When Theo asks, Ethan lies and says that Effie is in the active test group, and tells himself that it is over with Effie, declining her call.
1149	10	Episode 10	Laura Smith	Pete Lawson	26 October 2019	4.66
On his way to the hospital, Rash crashes into Ethan on his bike. While on the ward, he receives a call from his father, saying that he has lost Madia's death certificate. Rash saves the life of a patient with blood clots, and despise him not originally on the rota, Ethan lectures Rash, saying that he will look into the situation for negligence. Rash looks to Mason for support, but he refuses to get involved. Ethan proceeds to reprimand Rash, mentioning his breakup with Gem and his mother's death, and as the situation gets heated, Rash punches Ethan in the face. Rosa reveals that she told her mother she is dating someone called David, and that he is the perfect boyfriend, and that she used to have a son, but he died when he was eight. David agrees to pretend to be her boyfriend when her mother visits. After Oliver loses his temper and has an altercation with his karate instructor, he confides in Rosa that he is worried he has bipolar. Duffy begins volunteering at the hospital, and when Jade and Robin see her looking tired, they mention it to Charlie. He dismisses them, claiming that he does not need their help. Duffy takes a cab home at midday, due to feeling tired. Robin offers to pay for Duffy to have private treatment with the money left to her by Glen. Marty brings together a gay couple in the hospital who are not telling each other their true feelings.
1150	11	Episode 11	Eric Styles	Gerard Sempaio	2 November 2019	N/A (<4.94) (Note: Not reported in the weekly top 15 programmes for four-screen viewer ratings.)
While at the hospital, Effie collapses. Ethan treats her, and reveals to Theo that he kept her coughing up blood out of the file notes, and that he lied about her being on the active drug for the trial. While talking to Ethan, Effie severely coughs up blood and is rushed into resus. Ethan confesses to Dylan that he kept it from her file, to which he expresses annoyance. While chatting with Marty, Jade is confronted by a man called Nigel. She tells Marty that he is her case worker from when she was in care. Marty asks her if she is curious about her ancestry, so she calls Nigel and he reveals that Jade's mother gave her up when she was three. Nigel provides Jade with her case file, and she tears up reading a letter from her mother.
1151	12	Episode 12	Eric Styles	Katie Douglas	16 November 2019	4.84
Robyn collects her purse from her locker, and due to a lack of experienced nurses on shift for a CQC inspection, Charlie asks her to work. As she has Charlotte with her, she leaves Duffy to babysit her. She takes Charlotte to the park, but after suffering a dementia episode, Duffy walks away from the park and forgets she is looking after her. She heads to the hospital to see Charlie, and remembers Charlotte. Robyn later finds her through a photo Duffy took of her at the park. Robyn learns that Charlie knew about Duffy's dementia getting worse, and confronts him on why he put Charlotte's life in danger. Dylan tells Rash that after the fight with Ethan, he is on his final notice, and no more mistakes can be made. When treating a homeless patient that is adamant he does not want a scan, Rash is fearful that letting him go without treatment will make its way back to Dylan. Therefore, he manages to persuade him to have a scan.
1152	13	Episode 13	David Innes Edwards	Kim Millar, Johanne McAndrew and Elliot Hope	23 November 2019	4.66
When a drunk patient tries to make sexual advances on Ruby, Lev drags him from the ambulance and has an altercation with him. As the patient tugs on Lev's shirt, a right wing gang tattoo is revealed to be on his chest. Ruby tells Jan that she does not want to be partnered with Lev on callouts anymore. However, after seeing well how he treated a young boy on the ward, Ruby tells Jan that she wants to work with Lev, but only for medical reasons. Ethan treats a patient, Abigail, who talks about her father dying in a terror attack, and when he checks her files, he finds that she is Big Al's daughter. He begins to experience PTSD, and decides to tell Abigail about the events of the terror attack. After a suggestion from Will and an uplifting chat with Abigail about Big Al, Ethan looks into medical opportunities abroad. Rosa's mother, Xiomara, visits the hospital and confides in David about her illness which she is hiding from Rosa. She explains a Spanish idiom that David is Rosa's "media naranja" ("half an orange"), and that together, they form a complete orange. David pulls Rosa aside, and proposes to her by placing a ring in an orange, with Xiomara looking on.
1153	14	Episode 14	David Innes Edwards	Isla Gray	30 November 2019	4.88
While looking out the window at home, Duffy sees a cat. However, when Charlie looks, he does not see a cat, leading him to worry about her dementia. He takes her into the hospital, and Archie treats her. Charlie and Duffy accept that they need to have some form of help with Duffy's condition. When Rash and Mason treat a boxer with a life threatening condition, Mason suggests ordering a CT scan, but Rash says no due to being scalded by Dylan for ordering too many tests on patients. Mason looks into the condition, and heads to her fight, which Jade and Rash are watching via a livestream. When Ethan learns that Mason left while on shift, he reprimands him, but praises his actions.
1154	15	Episode 15	Piotr Szkopiak	Mark Catley and Colin Bytheway	7 December 2019	4.82
While on the phone to a help team, Charlie is distracted by Duffy getting ready for work. When Charlie tells her that she does not work at the hospital anymore, she becomes reserved. When her carer Sian arrives, she becomes unsettled as she has no idea who Sian is. Her carer has to pick her son up from school, and Duffy lashes out at Charlie. When Charlotte hides, Robyn assumes that she has gone missing. She heads into work with a bag of presents for her coworkers, except Charlie. She tells Marty that she is not going to forgive him, as he put her daughter's life in danger. Robyn confronts Charlie in the hallway, and the conversation escalates into an argument. As a result, Charlie walks away and the queues at reception heighten. Robin consoles Charlie, and informs him that the fellow nurses have devised a rota to care for Duffy. When Dylan encounters Rash and Mason bickering, he tells them to stop. Dylan oversees Mason performing minor surgery on a patient, and afterwards, he brags to Rash about how well he did. Dylan overhears, and reprimands Mason for having a big ego, and takes Rash into surgery instead.
1155	16	Episode 16	Piotr Szkopiak	Hilary Frankland	21 December 2019	5.25
When Ruby's heavily pregnant sister, Violette, turns up at the callout centre, they clash. Ruby accuses her of only visiting her for money, to which Violette gets offended and walks away. Ruby and Lev get called out to a woman giving birth, which turns out to be Violette. Ruby delivers the baby in the ambulance, but when there is something wrong with the baby, she checks Violette's medical files and reveals that she is a heroin addict. When Ruby argues with her, Violette runs away from the hospital while Mason treats the baby. Ruby promises the baby, Harmony, that she will find her mother, who is seen sleeping in an alleyway. David is preparing for the wedding when Dylan calls him in for a half shift. Dylan questions why David is not having a honeymoon, and suggests that he should not marry Rosa for Xiomara's sake. Xiomara tells David the truth, and when Rosa hears, she cancels the wedding. Xiomara intervenes, bringing the wedding outfits to the ward and announces that the wedding is happening, and the pair get married. Charlie prepares an early Christmas dinner to spend with Duffy, due to him working on the day. However, she claims that Bill is picking her up, and that he is a better man than Charlie, due to her dementia. Robyn arrives and gives Duffy a photo album full of memories from Duffy's life.
1156	17	Episode 17	Jordan Hogg	Dana Fainaru	28 December 2019	N/A (<6.00)
Rash finds Mason's body in a stock cupboard, and calls Will and Dylan over for help. They pronounce him dead, and an investigation into his death begins. The manager, Marina, tells the staff that they cannot divulge details with members of the public, which leads an ex-soldier getting increasingly angry with the staff. While treating a former chain-smoker, Rash meets Mason's mother, who reveals that Mason admired all of his coworkers, and when his patient's son hugs him, Rash bursts into tears.
1157	18	Episode 18	Jordan Hogg	Debbie Owen	4 January 2020	N/A (<5.60)
Connie returns from her break, and the staff show her a frosty greeting. When she learns of Mason's death, she arranges to pay for a memorial service to be held in his honour. Connie reprises her role as clinical lead, to the disgust of Archie and Charlie. Dylan receives the post-mortem for Mason's death, and reprimands the team for not noticing problems that led to his death. Violet overdoses on heroin, and when her friend discovers her unconscious, he uses her phone to call Ruby. Ruby and Lev take Violette into the hospital, and Ruby agrees to take care of Harmony.
1158	19	Episode 19	Roberto Bangura	Jillian Mannion	11 January 2020	N/A (<5.24)
While Jacob is treating a patient, they mention Mason's death. He becomes frosty, but when Jacob finds the patient about to be stabbed, he saves his life. Robyn offers to help Ruby out with Harmony, but she snaps and refuses help. However, when Lev goes to see her and offers that himself and Faith babysit for her, she agrees.
1159	20	Episode 20	Roberto Bangura	Rachel Paterson	18 January 2020	4.95
Faith and Lev's son falls from a bunkbed, breaking his wrist and lacerating his head. When Dylan treats him, he sends him in for a scan, suggesting there could be a more serious issue. Duffy phones Bill's former landline, insisting that herself and Bill are going to a concert together. Charlie tries to persuade her to forget him, but she refuses. Charlie visits Bill, and asks for him to visit Duffy. He does not realise the seriousness of her condition, and walks out on her. When Charlie attempts to console her, she demands to know where Bill is. Robyn suggests a babysitter to Ruby, but as she lives too far, Robyn suggests that she moves into her spare room, to which Ruby accepts.
1160	21	Episode 21	Eric Styles	Philip Lawrence	25 January 2020	N/A (<4.80)
While Marty is spending the morning in a hotel room with boyfriend Jack, he gets called in for a shift. He treats Liam, who has overdosed on antidepressants, and offers to call his husband. Jack visits Marty while on shift, and when Marty calls Liam's husband, it is revealed Jack is his husband, and has been cheating on him. Liam punches Marty, and when Marty tries to reconcile with Jack, he explains that he used him. Marty goes to a gay club, where he kisses a pair of boyfriends. Charlie takes Duffy into a care home, telling her that it is a day out. Midway through his shift, he phones the care home, and they tell him that Duffy has been excellent. After his shift, he visits Duffy, who has been sat on her bed all day with her suitcase packed, ready to go home. Robyn visits Charlie to accompany him, but is shocked to find Duffy back at home, and he affirms that he will take care of Duffy.
1161	22	Episode 22	Eric Styles	Katie Douglas	1 February 2020	5.67
Charlie wakes up to discover that Duffy has gone missing, and alerts the police. Having an episode, Duffy wears her former nursing uniform and heads to the hospital in heavy snow. Charlie finds her unconscious, and calls an ambulance. Connie oversees Duffy's treatment, and she makes a promise to Duffy to take care of Charlie after her death. A CT scan reveals that she has a bleed on her brain, and the doctors decide that there can be no further intervention. A braindead Duffy is taken into theatre, where her organs are donated. Violette asks Ruby if she can see Harmony, to which she agrees. She thanks Ruby for taking care of the baby, but reveals that she has no home to stay in. Ruby asks Robyn if she will allow Violette to stay, to which she agrees. Faith and Lev attend a consultation meeting, where they learn that their son, Luca, has a cancerous tumor on his brain, which must be operated on.
1162	23	Episode 23	Diana Patrick	Oliver Frampton	8 February 2020	5.21
Archie notices that Connie is acting withdrawn, and queries why she is not attending Duffy's funeral. Connie insists that she is needed at the ward, and walks away. Archie asks for Connie's help with an abuse case, and when she finds Connie crying over the funeral, Archie invites her for a drink. Charlie has doubts about attending Duffy's funeral, so David and Robyn persuade him to attend. He insists that the car should be driven to the hospital on the way, where the staff applaud Duffy. Robyn is unable to leave the car and waits outside. Afterwards, Charlie goes to make a cup of tea, accidentally placing two cups out. When he notices, be breaks into tears.
1163	24	Episode 24	Diana Patrick	Dan Berlinka	15 February 2020	N/A (<4.85)
Ethan tries to assist Rash throughout the day, who continually insists that he does not need any help. Ethan confronts him, and the pair reconcile. Violette uses drugs again, and when their neighbour sees her dealer leaving, she notifies Robyn. Ruby calls Violette, who gets angry at being checked up on. When Robyn overhears, she asks Will to talk to Violette over the phone. He informs her that Harmony has meningitis, and learns that she is at a train station, planning to run away. Ruby finds them and takes Violette into the hospital. After Robyn asks them to move out of her house, Ruby confirms that she will be contacting social services and applying for Harmony's residency.
1164	25	Episode 25	Steve Hughes	Johanne McAndrew, Elliot Hope and Dana Fainaru	22 February 2020	4.62
Ruby attends a family therapy session with Violette at her rehab centre, where she tries to persuade Ruby to let her out. She refuses, and when targeted by a patient who deals drugs, she overdoses. When taken into hospital, Connie tries to resuscitate her, but Violette dies. Faith discovers a support group for family members of cancer sufferers, and asks Lev to attend with her. He declines, uncomfortable with the idea. Dylan contacts Zsa Zsa about Luka's condition, and she agrees to come from America to treat him.
1165	26	Episode 26	Steve Hughes	Adam Hughes	29 February 2020	4.72
Zsa Zsa arrives to do Luka's surgery, and questions Dylan's motives behind going to such extreme measures for Faith. When performing the surgery, Zsa Zsa finds another tumor, and has to cancel it. She then suggests that Luka undergoes chemotherapy. Jade becomes concerned for Marty when he shows up to work hungover after a hook-up. After his shift, Marty goes to another man's house, but is rejected due to not being white. Charlie returns to work, despise comments from Robyn that he should take time to grieve. He becomes agitated when he learns that Jacob has changed the meeting day.
1166	27	Episode 27	Andy Newbery	Colin Bytheway	7 March 2020	4.74
Archie admits to Will that she has received a job offer from Megan Harrison in Sudan, and Connie later finds out through Megan. Connie informs Archie that she should take the role as she expects full commitment from her team. Archie says goodbye to Will and Connie, and leaves. When Marty is late for his shift, Jade covers for him, but gets in trouble with Charlie. She confronts Marty over his behaviour, but when he goes missing, Jade covers for him again. She later tells him that she will not be covering for him again. Ruby's mother, Lavender, suggests that she and her husband should have custody of Harmony, and Ruby agrees that she cannot cope.
1167	28	Episode 28	Andy Newbery	Stephen McAteer	14 March 2020 (Note: The broadcast of this episode was brought forward from 21 March 2020 to 14 March 2020, due to the cancellation of a Six Nations Championship game.)	N/A (<4.61)
Marty asks Jacob for two days off, who declines due to being short-staffed. Marty then asks Charlie, who says yes. When Jacob sees how Charlie is acting, he tries to persuade him to take time off to grieve, but Charlie ignores his suggestions. Jacob calls Fletch to voice his concerns. New paramedic Fenisha joins the team, and after flirting with Will, the pair agree to go on a date. Rash treats a patient whose partner is a doctor, and receives comments undermining his skills as a doctor. The relative demands to see his clinical lead, but Rash proceeds with his instincts and proves himself to the relative and Connie.
1168	29	Episode 29	Julie Edwards	Hilary Frankland	28 March 2020	N/A (<6.43)
Lev visits Luka in chemotherapy, and when Faith suggests he goes to a party, Lev says that he should focus on his treatment. Luka wants to play on the ward, and Lev shouts at him. They meet a graffiti artist, and take Luka out to spray paint on an unused wall. Ruby worries about Harmony, who is in the care of Lavender. Jan assures her that she has made the right decision. Jade, Jan and David make attempts to ask Charlie for advice on patients, but he snaps at each of them. Charlie then receives a do not resuscitate order from a patient, but forgets to put it in her notes, which led to her being resuscitated by Will after suffering a heart attack. Fletch tells Charlie an anonymous colleague has raised their concerns about his wellbeing and conduct. Charlie initially suspects David, accusing him of wanting revenge over a physical altercation which let to the latter's suspension the previous year. He then directs his anger at Jade, saying she will never make it as a real nurse. When Fletch intervenes, Charlie snaps at him and quits.
1169	30	Episode 30	Emma Wilkinson	Hilary Frankland and David Semple	4 April 2020	N/A (<5.72)
Danny, who is HIV-positive, is admitted to the hospital, and when Marty sees him, he is uncomfortable. Marty confronts Danny, and asks if he remembers him from last night, when the pair took drugs and had unprotected sex. Marty worries that he has contracted HIV, and confides in Jade. The pair reconcile, and she suggests he gets PEP and PrEP, and encourages him to call his mother. When he calls, his father answers, calling him selfish. On his way to drinks with Jade and other colleagues, he sees Danny getting in a taxi, and he invites Marty along. He declines, and heads to the pub with Jade. Ethan sees Fenisha and greets her, but she avoids him. He then buys Fenisha a coffee and explains that he will become less dependent for her, but she tells him that she is seeing someone. He wishes her well, when Will kisses her, revealing himself as her partner.
1170	31	Episode 31	Roberto Bangura	Michelle Lipton	18 April 2020	N/A (<5.44)
Connie oversees Rash's interactions with Nicola, a mother who is worried about her son. Rash says that he has a UTI, but she insists that it is appendicitis, despite his appendix having been removed. Nicola glues herself to the desk in reception, and refuses to leave until they are taken seriously. Rash orders a scan, where he finds that a small part of his appendix was left during the procedure. Connie commends him on being correct. Ruby visits Lavender's house, but finds the door open and Harmony crying on the floor, alone. She learns that Lavender plans on leaving the country with the baby. At work, Jan and Ruby are called to a train accident, where Ruby has to crawl under a stationary train to treat Hannah, a patient who was pushed under a train. Hannah's arm is trapped under the train, and realising it cannot be salvaged, Ruby performs an amputation. After work, Ruby races to the airport and persuades Lavender to allow her to take care of Harmony. She says her goodbyes to the ambulance team, thanking Jan for her support over the years. With Harmony, Ruby drives a campervan to Scotland to scatter Violette's ashes.
1171	32	Episode 32	Roberto Bangura	Jeff Povey and Stephen McActeer	25 April 2020	N/A (<4.83)
Fenisha learns that she is pregnant, and when Will insists on knowing more, she reveals that he cannot be the father, and that the father was a one night stand. Connie is shocked to see Charlie turn up in the emergency department after injuring his head while sleeping rough. He initially refuses to converse with the staff, but when Connie finds him about to steal prescription drugs from the medicine cabinet, she pulls him in for a chat, where he opens up.
1172	33	Episode 33	John Maidens	Rebecca Wojciechowski	2 May 2020	N/A (<5.22)
Despite Ethan wanting Fenisha to keep the baby, she visits an abortion clinic. While speaking with an employee there, she comes to realise that she might not want an abortion, and asks for more time. She then calls them back, and cancels her appointment. Noel asks Connie for a short meeting, but when she repeatedly pushes him back, he demands to see her. However, when she takes a phone call and ignores him, he leaves. Noel then meets a troubled 16-year-old called Bluebell, and her mother, Sandi. In spite of being told to leave them alone and focus on his job, he continues to support Bluebell and find out why she is distressed. He learns that her therapist has been molesting her, while drugging Sandi. Noel confronts the therapist, who throw each other down the stairs at the hospital. The events of this episode follow that of episode 43, "Code Orange", which was originally scheduled as episode 33. A recap of this key plot points from the episode were shown at the beginning of episode 33.
1173	34	Episode 34	Alex Jacob	Rachel Aird	23 May 2020	N/A (<4.35)
Jan is upset about covering overtime shifts as she rarely sees her wife, so Fenisha offers to take half of the shifts. She tries to inform Jan that she is pregnant, but is interrupted by a callout; a lighting rig has collapsed over a wrestling ring, trapping a wrestler underneath. Fenisha goes against Jan's instructions to wait for the fire crew and attempts to move the rig, causing it to collapse further and trap her ankle. Back at the ambulance station, Fenisha objects to Jan's official warning, stating what she had done to save the patient was right. The wrestler, Malc, is admitted to the hospital, where it transpires that he and Jade have had a past relationship. She catches up with him, and Marty suggests she made a wrong decision by breaking up with him. When Jade is talking to him, his wife and son visit him. She walks out, and Malc follows her into the staff room. He collapses with internal bleeding, and once he is conscious, he commends Jade on how far she has come in life. She calls Nigel and tells him that she wants to meet her birth mother.
1174	35	Episode 35	Alex Jacob	Dana Fainaru	30 May 2020	N/A (<4.62)
Will dismisses Ethan's suggestions while treating a patient, so Ethan pulls him aside to tell him Fenisha has had an abortion. Thinking she is no longer pregnant, Will asks Fenisha if they have a chance of a relationship, to which she says no. Charlie phones the hospital about not having his last wage, and they tell him that he needs to return his uniform in order to get it. On his way in, he unknowingly advises a mentally ill man, Mick, to fight to see his child. While Charlie is arguing with Connie, Mick grabs Connie and holds an entire ward hostage with a gun. Faith attempts to stab him with a syringe, to which he retaliates by shooting Dylan in the arm. Realising Mick's son is internally bleeding, Connie demands he goes into theatre, while Charlie stays behind with Mick as a hostage. After Mick gets shot, Connie asks Charlie if he wants to come back to work, to which he says yes.
1175	36	Episode 36	John Maidens	Charlie Swinbourne and Sophie Woolley	11 July 2020	4.21
Jade vents to Marty about the fears she has about meeting her birth mother, and he offers to accompany her, but she wants to do it alone. Jade meets Susie, her birth mother, and learns that she is deaf too. Jade asks her why she abandoned her, but Susie avoids the question and leaves, narrowly missing getting hit by a car. Jade assists Susie to hospital with her grandmother, Theresa, who does not know Jade is her granddaughter. In the hospital, Jade asks Susie again why she abandoned her. Susie explains that Theresa convinced her that Jade was not developing normally, unaware that she was deaf. Jade confronts Theresa, and states that any upbringing with Susie would have been better than her experiences in care. Theresa hits back by asking Jade not to contact her mother anymore, and Jade states that she cannot speak for her.
1176	37	Episode 37	Michael Lacey	Jillian Mannion and Dana Fainaru	18 July 2020	4.63
Jan's wife Ffion assumes that Jan has forgot their anniversary, but she surprises her with a card and dinner plans. Fenisha arrives for her shift 25 minutes late and overhears Jan trying to book a table, and Jan becomes tired with Fenisha's serial lateness. When Fenisha meets Ffion, she accidentally reveals that Jan was late to booking their anniversary meal. Due to helping a pregnant woman in a car accident give birth, Jan cannot attend the meal, but returns home to learn that Ffion was stuck at work too. Charlie sees the progress that Jacob has made as the temporary clinical manager, and decides to step down so that Jacob can fulfil the role permanently. Lev meets Evgeny, a Russian patient, and is shocked to find out that he is gay. Talking to Evgeny makes Lev have flashbacks of his childhood in Russia, where he recalls a childhood romance with a boy called Sergei. When leaving work, Lev receives a message from a man on a gay dating app.
1177	38	Episode 38	Michael Lacey	Tim Stimpson	25 July 2020	4.24
Fenisha sees Ethan at Holby comic con, where a van drives into a group of people. Ethan experiences PTSD when he witnesses the incident, but manages to adjust to the situation. Ethan, still under the assumption that Fenisha has had an abortion, asks if they can still be friends. Faith confronts Lev over his lack of support for her and Luka, and calls Dylan for support. She confides in Dylan about Luka's test results, as she learns that Luka will die as a result of the brain tumour.
1178	39	Episode 39	Paul Riordan	Philip Lawrence	1 August 2020	4.49
Faith and Lev are told that Luka is unable to undergo any form of treatment, and Rash suggests looking at treatment options in Germany. Faith discovers that there is a treatment plan which Luka is viable to undergo. Lev meets a man from a gay dating app, and vents to him about Luka's situation. The pair have sex, but Lev leaves his wallet in the man's car, who shows up at the ambulance dispatch. Lev tells him that their sex was not meaningless to him, and Dylan sees them kissing. Jacob pledges that he will pick up the medication of a patient, but forgets to pick it up when his interview for clinical manager is brought forward. The patient is later brought into the hospital and dies after a cardiac arrest. Upon Rosa's return from caring for Xiomara, Marty helps David to plan a return home surprise for her, despite wanting to stay in with her. When she returns, Rosa wants to stay in with David.
1179	40	Episode 40	Paul Riordan	Debbie Owen	8 August 2020	4.09
Noel announces that his daughter is pregnant. David struggles with his bipolar, and confides in Robyn that he has not yet told Rosa about the extent of his condition. Robyn suggests that David tells her, since it helped Robyn to know about Glen's condition when he was alive. David tells Rosa, and explains that he is fearful that she will leave him. She affirms that she will not leave him, but instead support him. Dylan treats Xander in the hospital, and realises that he is the man that Lev was kissing. He then confronts Lev, who asks him not to tell Faith due to the situation they are in with Luka's tumour.
1180	41	Episode 41	Ruth Carney	Katie Douglas	15 August 2020	4.16
Dylan informs Lev that if he does not tell Faith about him kissing Xander, then he will. Despite Lev pleading not to tell Faith due to Luka's situation, Dylan tells her, but she does not believe him. Fenisha is called out to an accident in a cave, where she discovers Jan is leading a group of teenagers on a caving pursuit. When Fenisha has to perform an emergency procedure on her, Jan expresses her faith in Fenisha as a paramedic. Fenisha later admits that she is pregnant, unaware that Jan has fallen asleep.
1181	42	Episode 42	Katherine Churcher	Hamish Wright	22 August 2020	4.33
An overworked Noel forgets to book a patient with a head injury in for a triage, and is upset to discover that she has died as a result of her worsened condition. Jacob disagree with Connie over providing the nurses' with as much training as the doctors, and Connie accuses him of abusing his new managerial powers. The pair get into a heated argument, which ends in them kissing.
1182	43	"Code Orange"	Steve Hughes	Simon Norman	26 September 2020	N/A (<4.39)
When several patients with the same symptoms are brought into the ED, Connie announces a code orange and a lockdown. Will pleads with Fenisha to inform others of her pregnancy, so that the baby is not at risk. She tells Ethan that he is the father of the baby, but asks him to keep the information from Will. Unbeknownst to the pair, Will overhears the conversation, and confronts them, saying that they are "welcome to each other". After the realisation that Marty had unprotected chemsex with a HIV-positive man, he gets an HIV test. Marty's father Graham is admitted to hospital after displaying symptoms, and the pair confront each other about his homophobic views. Graham explains to Jade that he knew a gay man who committed suicide due to not being accepted, and that he fears the same will happen to Marty. This episode takes place between the events of episodes 32 and 33, and was originally scheduled as episode 33.

== See also ==
- Impact of the COVID-19 pandemic on television
