= Marty Kirkby =

Fictional character from Casualty

- Casualty character
- Shaheen Jafargholi as Marty Kirkby
- First appearance: Episode 1106; 17 November 2018
- Last appearance: "The Straw"; 18 March 2023
- Portrayed by: Shaheen Jafargholi
- Spinoff(s): Holby City (2019, 2020)
- Duration: 2018–2023

In-universe information
- Occupation: Staff nurse (prev. Student nurse)
- Family: Bibi Kirkby (mother); Graham Kirkby (father); Kian Madani (cousin)
- Significant others: Joshua Bowers; Jack Ward; Danny Butler

Marty Kirkby is a fictional character from the BBC medical drama Casualty, portrayed by actor Shaheen Jafargholi. He first appears in the thirteenth episode of the thirty-fourth series, first broadcast on 17 November 2018. Jafargholi's casting was announced on 1 August 2018 and he was invited to read for the role shortly after finishing filming on EastEnders. Marty is characterised as a young and fashionable student nurse with a "razor sharp wit". He is a confident nurse who has a blunt bedside manner and excellent clinical skills.

Marty is introduced alongside fellow student nurse Jade Lovall (Gabriella Leon) and writers paired them as a double act tackling their final university placement in the emergency department (ED). Their "frenemies" relationship was used as light relief from the show's serious stories. Marty's stories include him lying to his boyfriend about being a single father and coming out to his parents. A negative response from his father sent Marty on a lonely "path of self-destruction", where he starts partying and having casual sex with strangers. Writers used the story to challenge his friendship with Jade, which Jafargholi disliked. His casual sex leads to him being the subject of racism and learning he may have contracted HIV.

The character was given a family link to Kian Madani (Ramin Karimloo), a character on the show's spin-off series Holby City. Producers chose to explore their relationship and Marty appears in an episode of the show's twenty-second series. The character departed the serial in the thirty-seventh series episode "The Straw", first broadcast on 18 March 2023. Television critics and viewers alike spoke positively about the character, with Helen Daly from the Radio Times calling him her "favourite nurse". Marty's friendship with Jade received a more mixed response; Sue Haasler of the Metro thought they made "an excellent double act" but disliked them being placed at odds. His partying story garnered an emotive response from critics, but a same-sex kiss featuring the character received 111 complaints.

== Casting ==
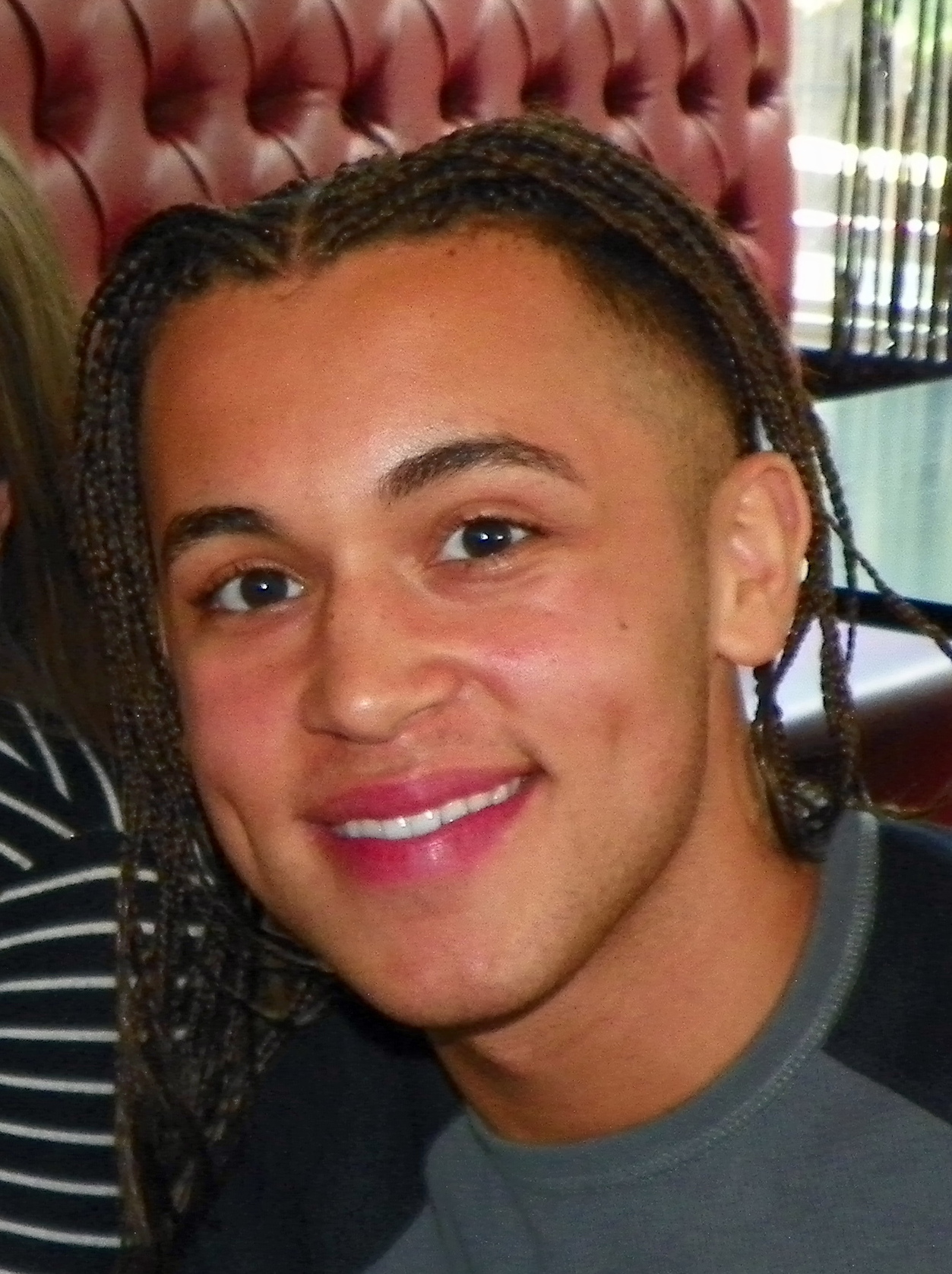
Shaheen Jafargholi was cast as Marty.

On 1 August 2018, Sophie Dainty, writing for entertainment website Digital Spy, reported that actor Shaheen Jafargholi had joined the cast of Casualty as new nurse Marty Kirkby. Jafargholi expressed his delight at joining the cast as he had been a fan of the show, and later called it "an honour [...] to become a small part of this legacy". On Jafargholi's casting, Lucy Raffety, the show's series producer, commented, "He is a huge talent with such a warm screen presence and we know he will bring so much to the show."

Jafargholi was invited to read for the part in early 2018, shortly after he concluded filming for his role as Shakil Kazemi at EastEnders. He had planned to have a break but upon reading the script for Casualty, he decided to read for the part. He then went on holiday and upon his return, he learnt he had been offered the role. He then began filming in July 2018. The actor commuted between Cardiff, where the show is filmed, and his home in London for the role. While filming for the show, Jafargholi would stay in a hotel before returning to his home at the weekend. He did not mind doing this as he found the commute easy. The actor is also Welsh and expressed his delight at working in Wales. Jafargholi joined the cast alongside actress Gabriella Leon, who portrays Jade Lovall. She was pleased about this and dubbed him her "partner in crime". He also liked this and thought it would have been scary to start alone, so he was pleased to work with Leon to start with.

Jafargholi was attracted to the role of Marty as it differed to the character of Shakil. He liked that Marty was older and a similar age to himself, but also found that the change in age meant he had to alter "mindset". Jafargholi was employed to the regular cast and hoped that Marty would establish his own "place" on the show. The actor struggled to learn the medical terminology involved with the show and often relied on the medical advisors on-set for help. He also found himself not knowing what the terminology meant when he was saying it. Jafargholi explained that he spends a lot of time researching the terminology to understand it better, and spoke to his mother, who works in a hospital, for advice on how to make the dialogue appear "natural" and "smooth". He received positive feedback from his mother's colleagues about his pronunciation.

Jafargholi previously appeared in Casualty, as a patient in the eighteenth series episode "Inside Out", when he was six years old. He had forgotten about the role until he auditioned for the role of Marty, and joked that he believes that the patient grew up to be Marty. Jafargholi found that he could relate to co-star Maddy Hill, who portrays Ruby Spark, as she appeared on EastEnders before joining Casualty like him. He said that he "[looked] up" to Hill and enjoyed working with her.

== Development ==
=== Characterisation ===
Marty has always wanted to be a nurse. It might have been the thought of helping someone that made him daydream of wearing scrubs, but it was most likely the pull of working with other sassy nurses that lived off endless cups of tea and had an encyclopaedic knowledge of trashy telly. In his eyes, this was the holy grail of occupations. Marty was different in school to many of his classmates and had a healthy dose of ambition from a young age. He's always had a delicious sense of humour and a love of all things trendy.

— An excerpt from Marty's profile on the official Casualty website.

Marty is introduced as a 22-year-old student nurse who is billed as "sassy", funny and fashionable. Jafargholi described him as "sharp-tongued and witty", "sarcastic" and sometimes too much. Similarly, Raffety said that Marty has a "razor sharp wit". On his character's sarcasm, Jafargholi commented, "He never misses an opportunity for a sarcastic comment!" He also labelled the character "mischievous", "cheeky", fun and "playful". Marty's wit and intensity can sometimes cause him to clash with other people. Jafargholi thought that Marty's persona makes him appear as a "know-all", and believed that he should be less divisive. He told Katie Baillie from the Metro that Marty has good intentions, but his actions do not always reflect this and he can often speak out of turn. He added that his inexperience, resulting from his young age, means he sometimes "puts his foot in his mouth". Jafargholi thought that although Marty is "very hardworking", he does not focus enough and instead "combines work and pleasure".

Marty is a confident nurse who is ambitious about his career. Despite his blunt bedside manner, which some patients dislike about him, he has "flawless" clinical skills and technical ability, which establish him as a perfect fit for his job. In Marty's eyes, nursing is the "holy grail of occupations". Jafargholi stated that in his job, Marty is "eager and keen to do well". He added that Marty has much "energy and enthusiasm" for his job. In his career, Marty always wants to improve and achieve a "position of power"; he plans on becoming a nursing manager before he turns 36 years old. Jafargholi explained that Marty will eventually organise himself and become the nurse he needs to be. The character's fictional backstory states that he decided to become a nurse at a young age and his ambition to achieve this set him apart from his peers at school. However, his social skills and trend-spotting prevented him from becoming a "social outcast".

Marty is openly gay and is quick to fall in love, which is his Achilles' heel. He is often left heartbroken after the breakdown of his relationships and has to remind himself that he cannot plan out of his love life. Despite this, Marty wants to "settle down" and have a family of his own. Jafargholi dubbed Marty a "hopeless romantic".

=== Introduction ===
Marty is introduced in the show's 1106th episode, which is within the thirty-third series, broadcast on 17 November 2018. He arrives at Holby City Hospital's emergency department (ED) for his final university placement as a student nurse. Jafargholi told Laura Donaldson of OK! magazine that Marty is excited to start work. He also explained that Marty wants to perform well at work and impress his new colleagues. To capture his first day at the ED, Marty uses his smartphone to record video messages. Marty is mentored by senior staff nurse Louise Tyler (Azuka Oforka) and joins the ED with fellow student nurse Jade Lovall (Leon). Jafargholi explained that Marty and Jade create an unexpected "burst of energy and life" when they arrive in the ED. The character's introduction was previewed in the show's seasonal trailer, released on 5 October 2018. A preview clip of Marty's debut was released on 16 November 2018 to further promote his introduction.

Marty soon learns that his new work environment is tougher than initially expected. Raffety noted that Marty would soon realise that his new job requires more than "a cheeky wink and a clever one-liner". Jafargholi told the Radio Times' David Brown that Marty is quickly "put through [his] paces" after he joins. Following his introduction, Marty finds himself in trouble with Louise and staff nurse Robyn Miller (Amanda Henderson), who he works closely with. Jafargholi explained that Louise would start reprimanding Marty for his inappropriate behaviour. Marty develops an admiration for the department's clinical lead, Connie Beauchamp (Amanda Mealing), and her fashion sense. Jafargholi told Sarah Ellis of Inside Soap that Marty likes Connie's vigour and personality and sees her as "a goddess", but often forgets that she is his boss. He added that he wanted writers to establish a friendship between Marty and Connie. In his early scenes, Marty compliments Connie's high-heels, which Jafargholi thought summarised his personality. Marty shares scenes with charge nurse Charlie Fairhead (Derek Thompson) and Jafargholi said that he enjoyed filming with Thompson.

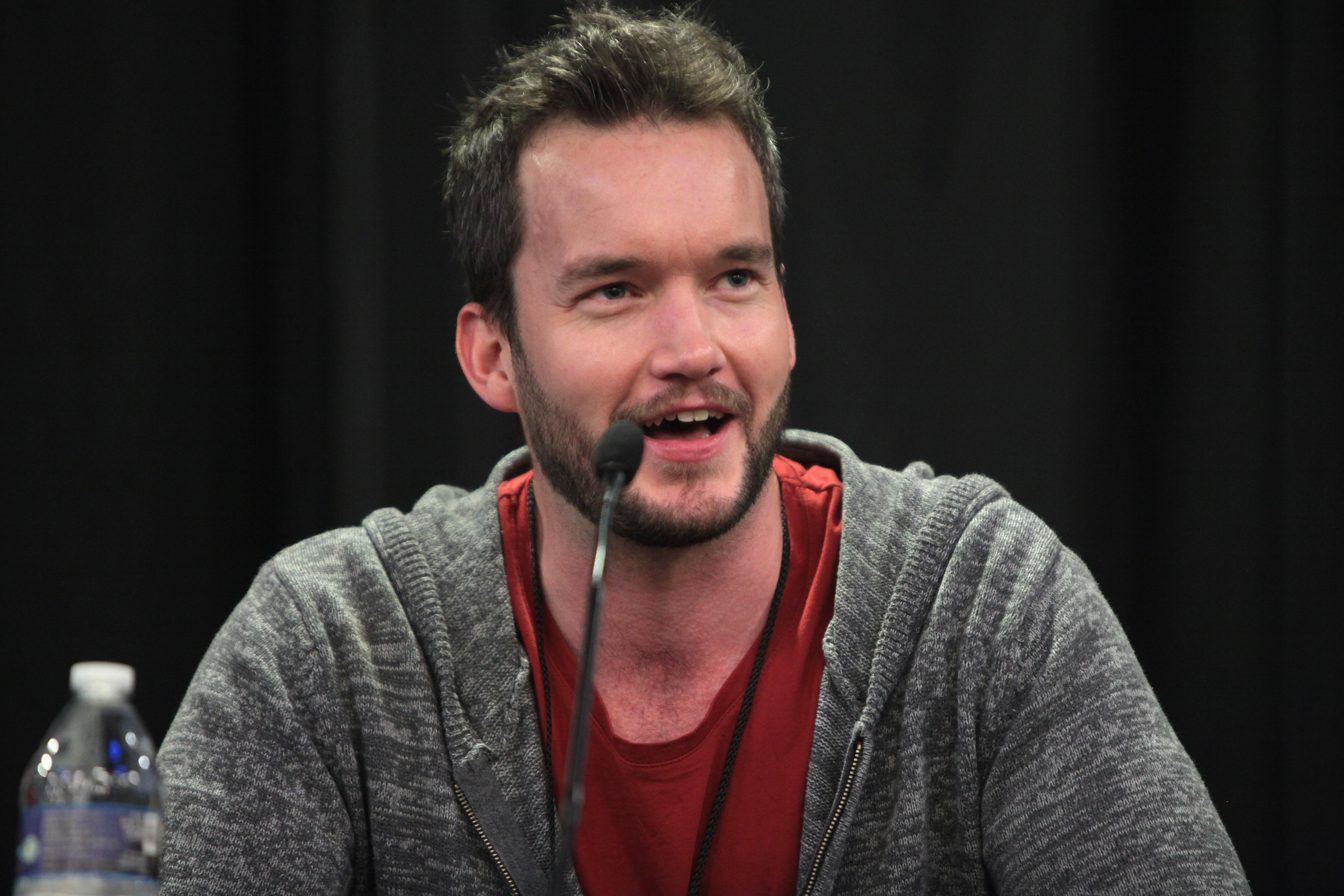
Gareth David-Lloyd was introduced as Marty's love interest.

Writers reintroduced "dishy doctor" Joshua Bowers (Gareth David-Lloyd) as a love interest for Marty. When he takes Robyn's daughter Charlotte to the hospital creche, Marty meets Joshua, who assumes that Marty is Charlotte's father. He decides not to correct him, so he can get closer to Joshua. They continue to grow closer and go on dates involving Charlotte and Joshua's daughter. Inside Soap's 2019 preview for Casualty revealed that Robyn would discover that Marty has been claiming that he is Charlotte's dad in upcoming episodes.

The story concludes when Robyn and Joshua meet at the hospital creche. Marty is unable to collect Charlotte as he is experiencing a shift with the paramedic team and becomes worried that his lies will be exposed. Robyn and Joshua discovering the truth coincides with a bad day for Marty as he lets down Louise with work and paramedics Iain Dean (Michael Stevenson) and Ruby Spark (Maddy Hill) eject him from the ambulance for his poor attitude. All these events leave Marty "ashamed and remorseful", so he decides to apply for a new placement elsewhere. However, he changes his mind following encouragement from Louise.

=== Friendship with Jade Lovall ===
Writers paired Marty with Jade as a double act tackling their first months working in the ED. They used them for light relief from the show's serious storylines. Simon Harper, the show's executive producer, thought they made a "brilliant, comic partnership", and Raffety opined that Marty and Jade would bring "a whirlwind of life and fun" to the ED. The characters regularly clash and were dubbed "frenemies" who share an "interesting Clash of the Titans friendship" by Leon. The actress pointed out that there is a difference in "attitudes and personality" between Marty and Jade. Jafargholi confirmed that the rivalry between Marty and Jade would develop into a friendship, and said that he enjoyed portraying comedic stories within a "predominantly serious" drama. Writers established the relationship between Marty and Jade in his first two episodes. Jafargholi noted that the pair's relationship "on a friendship level and a work level as colleagues" is explored. He enjoyed exploring the dynamics of the friendship and thought that comedic moments were created between them.

They regularly play games and have competitions in their work. Additionally, they each want to "one-up each other". Jafargholi explained that his relationship with Jade causes Marty's "competitive side" to emerge and leads to Marty doing things that he should not do. Marty and Jade soon discover whether their humour will work in the stressful work environment. Marty often accepts praise for Jade's work. Jafargholi and Leon agreed that the characters were both "sneaky". Leon thought that the characters shared a "real genuine connection" as they joined the ED at the same time and revealed that they would support each other. The actors enjoyed working with each other and felt it made their characters' connection "organic".

Marty and Jade clash over treating Rufus Addams (Kriss Dillon), a patient who they find attractive. Marty is assigned to Rufus' care but Jade becomes jealous and tries to assist. Upon learning more about Rufus, they become "smitten" with him and argue over who should treat him, deciding to have a competition. However, Jade takes the competition "too far" and locks Marty in a cupboard, leaving him in danger when he has an asthma attack. Jafargholi explained that Marty and Jade's "competitive nature" is the cause of the attack and observed that they would be in a better position if they had supported each other.

In another scenario, Louise reprimands Marty and Jade for not working while on-shift and warns them to reconsider their attitudes. Marty realises that Jade is "dragging him down", so rejects her in favour of his career. On his shift, Marty works hard and when Louise notices, she recommends him for a shift working with the paramedic team. Writers decided to further test Marty and Jade's relationship by having her move into his share house. Off-screen, Jafargholi and Leon live together in a flat, which the former found to be a reflection of the show.

=== Family ===
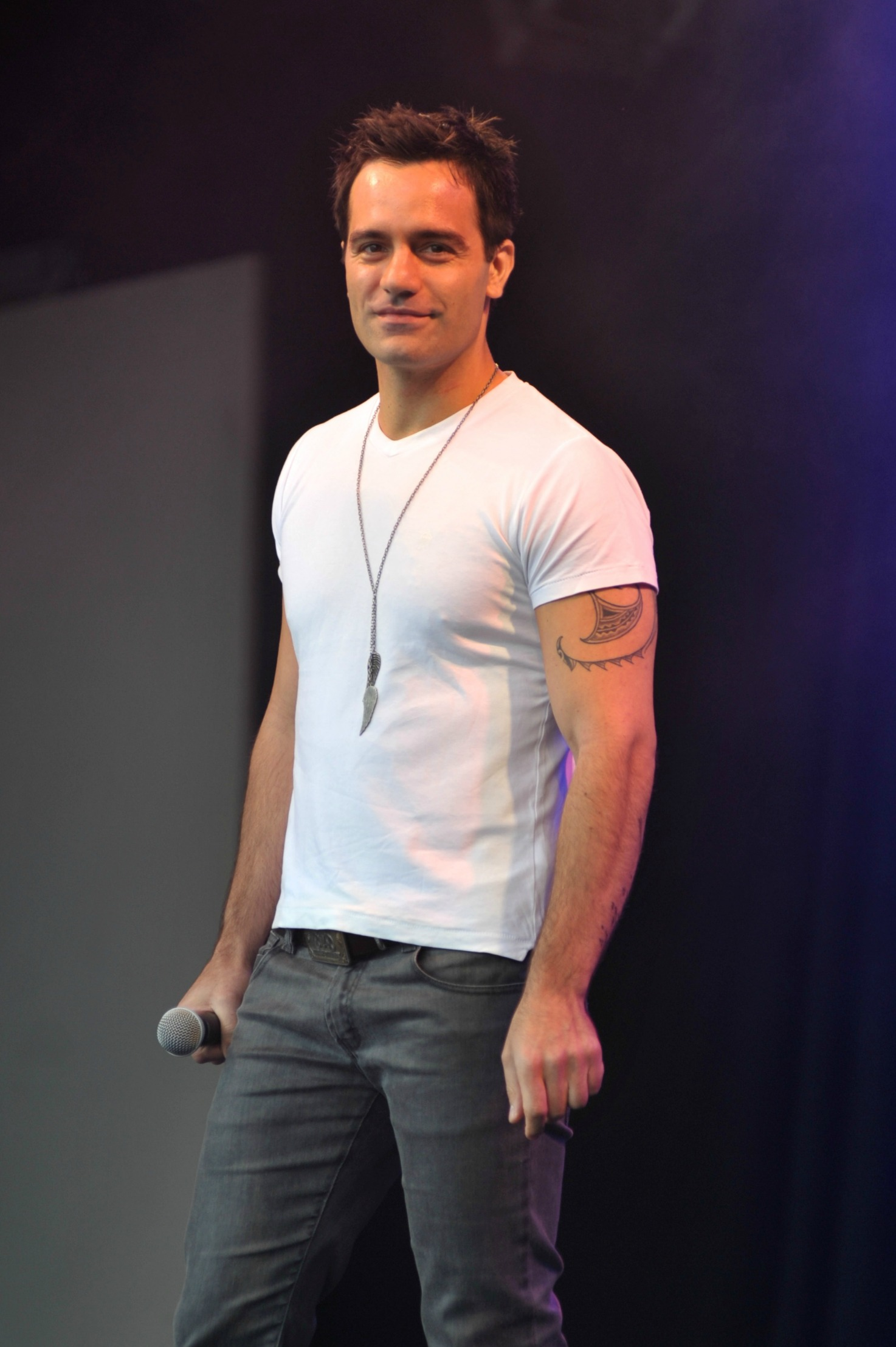
Kian Madani, portrayed by Ramin Karimloo (pictured), is Marty's cousin.

Kian Madani (Ramin Karimloo) was introduced to Casualty's spinoff series, Holby City, in April 2019 and in his character biography, he was established as Marty's cousin. Karimloo was excited about the connection and hoped to guest star in Casualty. He wanted producers to explore the relationship as he felt there was the opportunity for a compelling story, but appreciated that it was difficult as Casualty is filmed in Cardiff and Holby City is filmed in Borehamwood.

In May 2019, Raffety confirmed plans to explore Marty's family life, which was previewed in the show's seasonal trailer, released on 14 June 2019. The story had been teased in previous episodes. After patient Amy Wakes (Carol Starks) is injured in a homophobic attack, Marty sympathises with her and reveals that he is not out to his parents. Marty and Jade later compete for a nursing bursary, which Marty is awarded. Jade is jealous of the results and reads his personal statement. It details how Marty was bullied as a child and kept his sexuality a secret because of his Iranian background. Jade is upset that Marty has not told her about his past and when his father, Graham Kirkby (Philip Wright), calls, she invites him to the award ceremony. After Marty admits that he is not out to his parents, Jade panics, and claims to be his girlfriend to avoid outing him.

Marty's sexuality was further explored by having him come out to his parents. Marty brings Jade to a family party, where she impresses Marty's parents. However, the party ends when Marty's mother, Bibi Kirkby (Badria Timimi), collapses and is admitted to the ED. On the ward, Bibi admits to Marty that she knows he is gay and accepts him, delighting Marty. However, she warns him that she is not confident that Graham will react similarly. Marty ignores Bibi's advice and comes out to Graham, who devastates Marty by rejecting him. The story was mirrored in the episode with that of a patient who wanted to be accepted after coming out as a trans woman.

=== Rejection and partying ===
Writers incorporated Marty's rejection from his father into his next story as he starts partying frequently. Jafargholi explained that Marty has "a void" following his father's rejection. Jack Hardwick was cast as Jack Ward, a new love interest for Marty, which was revealed in the show's seasonal trailer, released on 6 December 2019. Sue Haasler from the Metro described Jack as "the ideal man – kind, generous and, most importantly, mad about Marty". Marty is elated with his new relationship and upon opening up about his previous struggles as an Iranian-British gay man, Jack confesses his love for Marty, who decides to commit to Jack by deleting his dating apps. However, he becomes upset after receiving a text from Graham, reminding him about his rejection. Marty goes to work where he treats pilot Liam Barnett (Patrick Baladi), but upon contacting Liam's husband, he discovers that his husband is Jack. Marty tries to save his relationship with Jack, but he rejects him and claims that they have different backgrounds. Marty leaves the ED "angry and heartbroken" and goes to a local bar. Jafargholi thought that Marty should start "thinking with his head rather than his heart".

Over a series of episodes, Marty's erratic behaviour was intensified, which also challenged his friendship with Jade. Writers took Marty on a lonely "path of self-destruction" as he begins to have sex with strangers, taking drugs and getting drunk, following his father's rejection. Jafargholi was disappointed with the challenges in Marty and Jade's friendship as he found it to be a highlight of the characters. He hoped that they would reconcile eventually. Jade first becomes concerned about him after he arrives to work hungover and lies to Charlie about needing a day off, but Marty accuses Jade of being jealous. Marty becomes the subject of racism when an online hook-up rejects him for his skin colour, leaving him "shocked, and utterly humiliated". Marty continues to struggle and when he is late for his shift, Jade covers for him. Jafargholi told Ellis (Inside Soap) that Jade is trying to be "a good friend" to Marty, but instead becomes involved in his lies. He pointed out that Marty "relies on Jade in a way he shouldn't" and added that Marty takes Jade "for granted". Marty bonds with terminally ill patient Dean Dunston (Tony Hirst) and confides in him about his struggles. Dean encourages Marty to speak to Jade, but before they can talk, Jade ends their friendship, having covered for Marty again. He is devastated and feeling isolated, he seeks out another hook up.

Casualty introduced the use of NHS rainbow badges in their costumes to coincide with Marty's story. The suggestion was made by This Morning's resident doctor, Ranj Singh, who asked Harper if the drama could feature them as a reflection on the NHS, who use the badges as a message of inclusion. Harper liked the idea and incorporated the badges into Marty's story. To maintain continuity, the badges were also introduced to Holby City and were incorporated into a sexuality story.

Writers created a turning point in the story when Marty discovers his casual sex and drug taking has put him at risk of contracting HIV. When HIV-positive patient Danny Butler (Anthony Selwyn) is admitted to the ED, it becomes apparent that Marty, who is treating him, recognises him. Danny does not remember Marty and admits that he has not been taking his HIV medication, leaving Marty "devastated" as they had unprotected sex the previous night. Struggling with his discovery, Marty breaks down and is comforted by Jade, who promises to support him after he opens up to her about his recent struggles. Marty sees the experience as "a much-needed wake-up call" and arranges an appointment at the local sexual health clinic, before deciding not to prioritise partying over friends.

The story was developed in an episode which was pulled from broadcast. The episode, which features the ED team dealing with a viral outbreak, was deemed "inappropriate" because of parallels to the current COVID-19 pandemic. The following episode, which aired in its place, began with an extended preview of the missed episode and revealed that the episode was "integral to Marty's character development". Plans to air the skipped episode, titled "Code Orange", were announced in September 2020, four months after being cancelled. Kate Oates, the Head of Continuing Drama at BBC Studios, expressed her pride at the episode and thought that viewers would be "delighted to watch the never-before-seen moments". The episode features Marty being tested for HIV and addressing his issues with drugs and partying, before arriving for chaotic shift as the ED deals with a lockdown following a chemical attack. In the department, Marty soon encounters Graham, who tells his son that he cannot accept his sexuality; Marty confronts Graham over his behaviour and reveals that he may have contracted HIV, worrying Graham. However, Graham soon becomes unwell after being infected by the chemical nerve agent, devastating Marty as he is unable to reconcile with his father. However, upon speaking to Graham's neighbour, Julia Ford (Kate Anthony), he realises that Graham does love him.

Marty's relationship with Graham was revisited in an episode broadcast in January 2021, which was set post-pandemic. Graham is admitted to the ED and praises his son for his work as a nurse during the pandemic. Marty rejects him, pointing out that he cannot choose what parts of his life to accept. While treating a patient in Resus, Marty is held hostage by a suicide bomber; he decides to stay with the patient during a hospital evacuation. Graham tries to convince Marty to leave, but he refuses, so Graham stays with Marty. Under pressure, Marty has to perform a difficult procedure on his patient alone. Graham is "overcome by [Marty's] bravery". The episode forms the conclusion of Marty's story as his father finally accepts him and his sexuality.

=== Departure ===
The character was written out of the series in 2023. He made his departure in the series thirty-seven episode "The Straw", originally broadcast on 18 March 2023. The episode also features the exits of Robyn and David Hide (Jason Durr). All three actors filmed their final scenes in 2022. Jafargholi and Henderson's departures had not been announced prior to transmission, surprising the audience. In the narrative, Robyn dies after not being treated quick enough following a car accident. Marty blames charge nurse Jacob Masters (Charles Venn) for Robyn's death and in protest of the broken system, he and David resign from their jobs and leave Holby.

=== Other appearances ===
A crossover event, "CasualtyXHolby", between Casualty and its spinoff series, Holby City, was planned in 2018. The casts of both shows were featured in the crossover, including Jafargholi as Marty. Harper explained that both casts would be featured "striving heroically against the odds in two episodes of pure, nail-biting, taut, emotional medical drama." In the episodes, Marty works with consultants Dylan Keogh (William Beck) and Serena Campbell (Catherine Russell) to treat a patient. The episode was filmed in November 2018 and first broadcast in March 2019.

Marty appears in a Children in Need interactive sketch, released on 9 October 2019 for the 2019 telethon. In the sketch, Marty and other characters, including Connie, Charlie, Archie Hudson (Genesis Lynea) and Ethan Hardy (George Rainsford), ask viewers various medical questions. The sketch was directed by Mealing and was filmed in a single take.

As part of plans to increase crossovers between Casualty and Holby City, Jafargholi reprised the role of Marty in Holby City again. Plans for the crossover were announced in August 2019 by Holby City series producer Jane Wallbank, who explained that Marty's relationship with Kian would be explored. She teased that they share some "family secrets". Marty appears in the 1010th episode of Holby City, which is within the twenty-second series, broadcast on 15 January 2020. Marty's appearance coincides with a story exploring Kian's mental wellbeing. Worried about his cousin, Marty visits Kian at his office and warns him to "slow down". When Kian does not listen to him, Marty speaks to his colleague Jac Naylor (Rosie Marcel), who also ignores Marty's concern. However, after he collapses, Kian reveals to Jac that he had a morphine addiction and Marty had helped him recover.

== Reception ==
For his portrayal of Marty, Jafargholi was nominated for Best Drama Star at the 2020 Inside Soap Awards. Inside Soap's Laura-Jayne Tyler dubbed Marty a "cheeky nurse", and Emma Bullimore, writing for What's on TV, labelled Marty the "enthusiastic new student nurse". Her colleague, Elaine Reilly, called him the "hospital gossip". Brown (Radio Times) dubbed Marty the "upbeat new nurse" and liked his attitude towards Connie because he found it irregular, Haasler (Metro) described Marty as "bright, lively, very vain and rather fabulous", and Lewis Knight of the Daily Mirror called Marty a "fan-favourite". Joe Julians, writing for the Radio Times, branded Marty "good-humoured and very much a people person" and noted that his "weakness is a heart that always seems to get broken", while his colleague Helen Daly called Marty her "favourite nurse". What's on TV magazine included Marty's introduction in their TV highlights for the week 17−23 November 2018. Milward (Daily Express) predicted that Marty's introduction would "bring a breath of fresh air" to the show. Baillie (Metro) thought that Marty's "boistrous personality and cheeky charm" would "ruffle a few feathers" with his colleagues.

The pairing of Marty and Jade received a mixed response. Haasler liked it and opined that it "works brilliantly". She later wrote that they made "an excellent double act" and thought they worked as light relief in an otherwise "bleak" episode. She was more critical about writers placing them at odds and disliked their "annoying squabbling". Radio Times critic Alison Graham called Marty and Jade the "two very annoying new nurses", and thought they were examples of "abysmal" discipline towards the ED's staff. She criticised Marty for making "inappropriate jokes in front of gravely sick patients". Brown expressed his interest in Marty and Jade's friendship, calling it "a sweet work partnership" which he wanted to be further explored. Dainty (Digital Spy) dubbed Marty and Jade "friendship goals", and Rebecca Miller of the Daily Express called Marty and Jade a "fan-favourite duo", In one story, Jade and Marty compete for a nursing bursary, which Jade does not have faith in herself to win. Haasler (Metro) was surprised as she thought "Marty didn't seem to do much at all". On Jade pretending to be Marty's girlfriend, Haasler (Metro) wrote, "This will probably work out just as well as when Marty pretended to be Robyn's daughter's father."

Dainty liked the character of Marty, but wrote mixed reviews about his stories. She opined, "The cheeky chappy has been a breath of fresh air since joining the ED, and he's certainly got potential where the job is concerned". However, she disliked his relationship with Joshua, dubbing it "a non-medical mess". She later included Marty in a list of characters to "watch out for in 2019", describing him as the "effervescent new nurse". She wrote unfavourably on his romantic plots, but observed that he is "fast-becoming a favourite among his colleagues in the ED." Writing about the success of Casualty, Dainty named the introductions of Marty, Jade, Archie and Will Noble (Jack Nolan) as reasons behind it. She commented, "Jade and Marty's arrivals also injected a much needed sense of fun in the show, which has acted as a refreshing break from some of the heavier stories".

Following the release of the Summer 2019 trailer, Dainty commented, "it looks like viewers will be seeing a more vulnerable side to the cheerful nurse over the summer months". An Inside Soap columnist wrote that Marty is "brought back down to earth with a bump" when he learns about Jack's infidelity. Haasler (Metro) sympathised with Marty after learning Jack is married, commenting, "Of course we don't care about Jack but we do care about Marty", but disliked his manipulation of his grieving boss, Charlie. The episode featuring Marty's relationship with Jack was selected by Ali Catterall of The Guardian as a television highlight of the day. A same-sex kiss between Marty and Jack received 111 complaints, despite the pair being fully clothed and the kiss airing after the watershed. Multiple media outlets, including Attitude magazine, the Daily Mirror, the Metro and Queerty magazine, criticised the complainents.

Shaun Linden from ATV Today named an episode featuring Marty's rejection issues their television highlight of the day, and the episode featuring Marty's HIV discovery was listed in the television highlights for 4 April by What's on TV's Elaine Reilly. Milward (Daily Express) branded Marty a show "favourite" who has been "taking the spotlight in recent months" with his partying antics, and dubbed Marty a "beloved character". Of Marty's partying, Brown (Radio Times) opined that Marty is "secretly in torment" as his "hedonistic lifestyle is about to catch up with him". Susannah Alexander, writing for Digital Spy, noted that viewers were disappointed about the missing episode as they felt it was "important" to Marty's character development. When the episode was aired, it received a four star rating from Reilly (What's on TV).
