= Ruby Spark =

Fictional character from the BBC medical drama Casualty

- Casualty character
- First appearance: Episode 1090; 14 July 2018
- Last appearance: Episode 1170; 18 April 2020
- Portrayed by: Maddy Hill
- Spin-off(s): Holby City (2019)
- Duration: 2018–2020

In-universe information
- Occupation: Paramedic
- Relatives: Lavender Spark (mother); Hugo Spark (father); Violette Spark (sister); Harmony Spark (niece)

Ruby Spark is a fictional character from the BBC medical drama Casualty, played by Maddy Hill. She first appears in the forty-first episode of series thirty-two, originally broadcast on 14 July 2018. The character and Hill's casting details were announced on 18 January 2018 and she began filming during the following month. For the role, the actress qualified as a Heavy Goods Vehicle (HGV) driver. Ruby is a paramedic and is characterised as a smart, caring and opinionated perfectionist who lacks social skills. Her near-photographic memory of procedures and medication serves as an important character point as she struggles to deviate from the rules. The character's backstory states that she has just graduated from university, adding to her over-emphasis on rules. Ruby is introduced as part of the show's increased focus on paramedics and producers wanted to explore the profession through the character.

Ruby clashes with paramedic Iain Dean (Michael Stevenson) and was integrated into his story about post-traumatic stress disorder (PTSD). The story develops in a Casualty-Holby City crossover event, "CasualtyXHolby", where Ruby finds Iain after he attempts suicide. Producers created a new story for Ruby when she is stalked by a patient's daughter, Dani Mallison (Georgia Hughes). In her next story, Ruby's sister, Violette Spark (Kelly Gough), is introduced. She struggles with a heroin addiction and later dies, so Ruby begins caring for her newborn daughter Harmony. The story leads to the character's departure from the serial and she exits in the thirty-first episode of series thirty-four, originally broadcast on 18 April 2020. The character has been well-received by critics and viewers alike, with Violette's death receiving particular praise.

== Casting ==
On 18 January 2018, it was announced that actress Maddy Hill had joined Casualty as paramedic Ruby Spark. She began filming during the following month. Hill expressed her excitement at joining the show and described Ruby as a character "like no one I've ever played before". Lucy Raffety, the show's series producer, was pleased about Hill's casting and expected her to be a "massive hit" with the audience. Reflecting on the casting in August 2018, Raffety opined that Hill had "embraced part of Ruby".

For two years, Hill appeared on soap opera EastEnders. She found her prior experience helpful when filming on Casualty, as the two shows operated similarly. The differences between Ruby and her EastEnders character, Nancy Carter, were a significant reason for Hill accepting the role. She felt that Ruby presented a challenge for her to enjoy. She told Sophie Dainty of Digital Spy that she liked playing characters that she would not befriend in real life as it challenges her as an actress. For the role, the actress spent a day learning how to perform CPR. She also had to take another driving test in preparation for driving an ambulance. She took part in a two day-long course in Somerset, which qualified her to drive a Heavy Goods Vehicle (HGV). Hill initially found that the gory scenes made her "light-headed" but soon calmed when she realised it was a jam-like substance used to create the fake blood. Hill relocated from London to Cardiff, where the show is filmed, for the role. She made the decision to live in a flat rather than stay in a hotel as many cast members opt to do, and she later began sharing a flat with co-star George Rainsford, who portrays Ethan Hardy.

== Development ==
=== Characterisation ===
At first glance Ruby has it all – looks, intelligence and even a caring side. The only problem is she’s her own worst enemy. Her self-defence comes in the form of a strong opinion and a focus on detail which can keep others at arm’s length. Break down this wall and you’ll be surprised what’s behind it, the only problem is no one has managed to do it yet.

— An excerpt from Ruby's profile on the official Casualty website.

Ruby is billed as a "conscientious and ambitious" paramedic who has an "idealistic" view of the world. She is a perfectionist, smart, caring and opinionated. Hill called Ruby "very pedantic and rule-abiding", which she was excited to portray as she felt it would create comedic scenarios. She had not portrayed a character with these traits before. The actress told Allison Jones of Inside Soap that Ruby is "very textbook" and her "obsession" with rule-following often lands her in trouble. She added that Ruby is "not very malleable to the people she meets". Ruby's intelligence makes her perfect for treating patients at accident scenes. The character is described as "naïve" and despite being able to "literally quote the rule book", she has lots to learn about the practicalities of being a paramedic. Hill explained that Ruby is often more likely to follow the rules rather than use her "common sense and judgement", which creates problems. She frequently struggles with the job's "more instinctual parts". Hill suggested that Ruby should become more flexible in her work. As part of her job, she has to challenge her core values.

One of Ruby's main characteristics is her near-photographic memory of procedures and medications. Hill felt that Ruby's near-photographic memory of textbooks challenged her as it meant she could not improvise her lines at risk of messing the order of the medical terminology. When paramedics bring a patient to the emergency department (ED), they perform a handover to the medics. Paramedics typically recite the patient's medical state using written notes, but Ruby's near-photographic memory means that she remembers everything. This presented a challenge for Hill, who had to recall all the intricate details. To familiarise herself with a typical handover, Hill asked producers for an example before she began filming, which she found lengthy. The actress admitted that she was surprised to find Ruby's first handover was much longer than this, lasting three pages of the script. Ruby's extensive knowledge means that she knows the rules that she should follow and therefore, she struggles to deviate from them.

Ruby is very self-conscious and does not let her guard down. To avoid any mishaps in her social life, Ruby tries to avoid social situations. If she was in an embarrassing situation, Ruby would replay the situation in her head multiple times afterwards. Hill thought that her character's lack of self-confidence may irritate viewers, or make her "endearing", but was unsure which. Due to her devotion to her work, Ruby does not find time to socalise. Hill found this amusing and very realistic. Ruby wants to make friends at work but struggles with this. She bonds with her boss, operational duty manager Jan Jenning (Di Botcher) and Hill explained that Jan recognises that Ruby's "heart is in the right place" and does not want her to feel isolated. The actress thought that her character would not suit a relationship as she would struggle to relax. She theorised that Ruby may have once had a boyfriend, but found it "all too stressful".

Producers incorporated some of Hill's own characteristics into Ruby's personality as they learnt more about her. The character's backstory states that she has just graduated from university. Hill thought this reflected how real-life paramedics were sent into the job without time "learning on the job". She added that the NHS needs people immediately due to how overstretched it is, so Ruby believes that she can "hit the ground running". The actress also felt this aided her portrayal of the character as they were both starting new experiences. Ruby's costume is a paramedic uniform, which Hill enjoyed wearing. She dubbed it her "ninja turtle suit" and was likened to Lara Croft while wearing it. The design of the costume meant that Hill could wear thermals underneath, which helped her in the colder months.

=== Introduction ===
The character is introduced in the forty-first episode of series thirty-two, originally broadcast on 14 July 2018. The episode marks the show's return following a two-week summer break. Her introduction was previewed in the show's summer trailer, released in July 2018. Two promotional clips of her debut were also released on 10 and 13 July, respectively. The character's introduction builds towards the show's thirty-third series which has a focus on the paramedic team. Producers explored the life of a paramedic through the character of Ruby. Raffety thought this would be "both heartwarming and heartbreaking", and explained that Ruby provides an "immediate experience of what it's like to be out on the rig and be part of this slightly dysfunctional paramedic family". Hill was excited about the focus on the paramedic team.

Her first day is billed as "a baptism of fire" that causes Ruby to question herself. Ruby begins her shift with the mindset of following the rules and what she learnt at university. Hill explained that Ruby believes that "if she follows the rules then everything will be alright". On her first call out, Ruby is punched by a patient. This was the first scene Hill filmed and she thought it made "an ideal introduction". On another call out, Ruby tries to save an elderly patient but inadvertently worsens the situation. Hill attributed this to Ruby following rules "too closely", but believed that her character was justified in wanting to follow the rules on her first day. At the end of the day, Jan evaluates Ruby's position on the team and considers whether she is suited to working in Holby. Hill spent her first week of filming on location with Michael Stevenson (who portrays Iain Dean) and Charlotte Salt (who portrays Sam Nicholls), which she enjoyed. Her first scenes were filmed during the Beast from the east weather event and Hill found filming very cold. A typical filming schedule for the actress consists of a week filming on location, followed by a week filming in the show's studios. She enjoyed this and likened it to filming a movie.

Ruby's personality creates problems with her colleagues Iain and Sam. Where Ruby feels the need to follow the rules, they are more confident and trust their decisions. On this, Hill commented, "They are basically lads and Ruby is just not a lad at all." She explained that Ruby plays "gooseberry" between Iain and Sam and "ruptures their friendship". Hill added that while they clash on their decisions, they are pushed together by their desire to help people. Ruby initially does not trust them, which Hill thought she needed to work on. The actress thought that Iain would be "the perfect person" for Ruby to learn from as he uses his instinct a lot. She added that if Ruby sees Iain working well, she would "learn to loosen up a bit". As Ruby begins to learn from Iain and Sam, they start to warm to her. Hill noted that Iain starts to "respect Ruby's knowledge".

=== Supporting Iain Dean ===
Sam is killed-off and writers used her death to explore new stories for the paramedic team. Raffety explained that she wanted to look at the paramedics coping with their front line positions while mourning Sam. Iain begins to resent Ruby's presence in the aftermath of Sam's death, and she works to prove herself to him. Writers incorporated Ruby into Iain's story tackling post-traumatic stress disorder (PTSD). Despite his treatment of her, Ruby supports Iain through his problems and they start to bond. However, she is left "mortified" when Iain tries to kiss her while having a drink together in the pub. Ruby is quick to forget about it, but Iain is embarrassed, sparking him into further depression.

Writers placed Ruby and Iain in a hostage situation as part of the story. When they attend a shout, they find an armed man who threatens them both. Iain deduces that all the bullets have been used from the gun and confronts the man, who relents. Hill and Stevenson enjoyed filming the hostage situation and while filming, they kept trying to figure out if they had correctly calculated how many bullets were left. Ruby and Iain continue to bond as they work, developing a "candid connection". Following speculation that Ruby and Iain could start a romantic relationship, Stevenson ruled out the development. He and Hill discussed the possibility of a romance and concluded that it would not work due to the characters' age gap and difference in personalities. Stevenson opined that the friendship had "gone through the ringer[sic]" and "been on a huge friendship and learning curve".

The story takes focus in a crossover event, "CasualtyXHolby", between Casualty and spin-off show Holby City. Planning for the event began in 2018 and features the casts of both series, including Hill as Ruby. Both shows are set in the same hospital and the crossover sees the hospital experience a power outage due to a cyberattack. The episodes were filmed in November 2018 and first broadcast in March 2019. One main plot point in the crossover is Iain's attempted suicide, which is discovered by Ruby. Stevenson told Elaine Reilly of What's on TV that Ruby understands Iain, so she is able to understand something is wrong with him. He added that although Ruby notices Iain is acting strange, their previously "volatile relationship" meant that she felt that she could not ask him personal questions. Stevenson commented, "She thinks Iain is a fiery character who's going to lay into her if she asks him one more time."

Ruby visits Iain at home, where she finds him unconscious, initially believing him to be asleep. She brings him to the ED and tries explaining that he tried to kill himself, but Iain's sister, Gemma Dean (Rebecca Ryan), refuses to believe her. Stevenson observed that Ruby "works very hard" to get Iain to the ED and then finds it "unbelievably difficult" to persuade people about Iain's decision. Needing to prove her suspicions, Ruby searches Iain's house for the drugs, which she finds and presents to the team. Stevenson explained that Iain's mystery illness creates "mass confusion in the hospital" and Ruby becomes responsible for proving the truth, having only based her theory on Iain's behaviour. He added that Ruby struggles to tell Gem as it is "a massive task". Iain has an operation and afterwards, Ruby visits him and finds he has survived.

When Iain returns to work months later, Ruby struggles with how to act around him. They have a challenging shift which highlights the strain in their relationship. Jan notices this and informs Iain that Ruby is still "traumatised" by what happened. Ruby continues to support Iain and prepares a written support plan for him, which he rejects. When Ruby begins attending paramedic support groups, Iain joins her but refuses to speak at the meetings. Writers created a turning point in Ruby and Iain's friendship after he attends a call-out to a suicide. Realising what Ruby felt like finding him, he decides to open up at one of the meetings, leading to them reconciling. When Iain decides to leave for a job with the Helicopter Emergency Medical Service (HEMS), Ruby and Jan are initially conflicted about whether it is a good decision. Stevenson noted that this makes Iain question his decision. Ruby, Jan and Dixie Dixon (Jane Hazlegrove) feature heavily in Iain's departure. Stevenson liked this as he felt they were "three of the most influential people" in his tenure.

=== Stalker ===
Producers planned a new story for Ruby with the introduction of Dani Mallison (Georgia Hughes), the daughter of a patient. Hughes was hired on a semi-regular contract to portray the story over multiple episodes. The story was announced on 6 March 2019, and previewed in the show's seasonal trailer, released the following day. In an interview with Reilly (What's on TV), Raffety described the plot as a big story for Ruby and teased, "It all goes horribly wrong..." Ruby attends a call-out to Dani's mother, who is in the end stage of motor neuron disease, and when she dies, Ruby supports Dani. Jan warns Ruby not to get emotionally involved with her patients. In spite of the advice, Ruby gives Dani her phone number and a lift home. Dainty (Digital Spy) theorised that Ruby could be placed in danger by Dani. Dani later visits Ruby at work and they bond as Ruby teaches Dani first aid. Dani then installs a tracker on Ruby's phone and changes her hairstyle to match Ruby's.

Writers continued to plot "sinister" moments in the story as Dani insists on shadowing Ruby at work, tracks her movements, lies to Ruby about her mother's birthday, and steals her stethoscope. The story and Hughes' guest stint concludes when Ruby finds Dani about to operate on a patient, having claimed to be a paramedic. Ruby realises that the situation is "well out of hand", so tells Jan, who is furious and informs the police. Dani is "upset and humiliated" and crashes her car, before refusing treatment from anyone except Ruby. Ruby treats Dani and explains that she understands that she is grieving, before asking her to leave her alone. Following her final scenes, Hughes expressed her joy at portraying Dani and raising awareness for her situation. Producer Dafydd Llewelyn praised Hill and Hughes for their work on the story.

=== Sister's drug addiction ===
In September 2019, Loretta Preece, the show's series producer, revealed that Ruby would feature in a new story which would challenge her. Further information was revealed on 26 November 2019 when actress Kelly Gough's casting as Violette Spark, the estranged sister of Ruby, was announced. It was reported that Ruby and Violette have "a rocky past" and she would arrive with "a huge bombshell". Violette's introduction serves as the main story for the show's Christmas episode. The story was previewed in a trailer released on 6 December 2019. Ruby is shocked to see that Violette is pregnant but is delighted when she gives birth to a daughter, Harmony. Harmony's condition deteriorates at the hospital and Ruby learns that Violette is a former heroin user, deciding that Harmony is suffering from withdrawal. Violette claims to have been clean since becoming pregnant, but flees the hospital, leaving Ruby to raise the baby. On Violette's heroin addiction, a show spokesperson said that over many years, Ruby has watched her sister "succumb to her addiction".

When Harmony is discharged from the hospital, social services ask Ruby whether she would care for her. While deciding what to do, Ruby learns that Violette has suffered a heroin overdose and is admitted to the ED. Violette is treated and Ruby decides to care for Harmony, on the condition that she seeks help for her addiction, which Violette agrees to. A show insider explained that Ruby believes that Harmony will be "enough to make Violette realise that she had to kick the habit for good". Writers portrayed Ruby struggling to adapt to caring for Harmony and trying to find solutions online. Her colleague, Lev Malinovsky (Uriel Emil), gives her advice on how to approach the situation and offers support from him and his wife, nurse Faith Cadogan (Kirsty Mitchell). Ruby rejects their offer of help, believing that she can cope alone. After time in rehab, Violette moves in with Ruby and her housemate, Robyn Miller (Amanda Henderson).

Writers developed the story by having Violette suffer a relapse. After being offered drugs by her ex-boyfriend, Violette accepts, but when she later awakens, she is horrified by her actions and realises that Harmony's temperature is high. When Robyn informs Ruby that one of their neighbours saw a man leave the house, Ruby calls Violette, suspicious that she has relapsed. Violette initially denies the claims, but becomes panicked about "listless and unresponsive" Harmony. Ruby orders her to bring Harmony to the ED, but Violette refuses. A show insider explained that Violette is worried about doctors "[deeming] her an unfit mother". Ruby asks paediatric consultant Will Noble (Jack Nolan) to speak to Violette about Harmony's symptoms and he diagnoses a dangerous form of meningitis, which could be fatal if not treated fast. Ruby then races to get Harmony to the ED. Feeling let down by Violette, Ruby announces her intentions to apply for full custody of Harmony.

The story concludes with the death of Violette. Having admitted herself to rehab again, Violette works to get clean but struggles mentally and physically. She tells Ruby that she is struggling with backache, but Ruby believes this is a withdrawal symptom and dismisses her. They have a confrontation and when Ruby leaves, Violette accepts drugs from a woman at the clinic. Violette suffers a large aortic aneurysm, resulting in her going into cardiac arrest. Ruby tries to save her and after extensive CPR, the medics declare her dead, leaving Ruby "devastated".

=== Departure ===
Hill's departure from the serial was announced on 13 April 2020, with Ruby leaving in the thirty-first episode of series thirty-four, originally broadcast on 18 April 2020. A promotional clip was released on 2 April 2020 previewing the character's final episode. Her exit storyline begins following Violette's death, when Ruby's mother, Lavender Spark (Sian Webber), is introduced. Lavender asks Ruby for custody of Harmony after becoming concerned that Ruby is too focused on her career. This upsets Ruby, who highlights Lavender's poor upbringing of her and Violette. Lavender is annoyed by Ruby's reaction and accuses her of being responsible for Violette's death. Another visit from Lavender makes Ruby question herself and consequently, she decides to give her parents custody of Harmony, afraid of failing her. Ruby struggles in the aftermath of her decision and opens up to Jan, who urges her to reconsider her decision.

Ruby's exit is sparked from learning that her parents are moving abroad with Harmony, prompting her to realise she made an error. Ruby heads to the airport and stops Lavender from taking Harmony with her. She explains that she wants Harmony to stay with her in Holby. Returning to work, Ruby announces that she is quitting her job and moving away with Harmony. Writers created a dramatic final shift for the character which highlighted her character development. On the shift, Ruby treats a woman who has been pushed under a moving train. She needs her arm amputating and Ruby decides to perform the operation to save her life. Her actions are "out of her comfort zone" but she is praised by the medics. Jan then reminds Ruby about her first shift, praising her achievements. She then notes how Ruby was wrong about being able to be a good paramedic and the same could apply to being a parent.

== Reception ==
Reilly (What's on TV) thought that Hill would be "a perfect fit for Casualty", but questioned Ruby's suitability to Holby. Her colleague, Naomi Bartram, called Ruby's introduction "dramatic" and observed that viewers were "impressed" by the character. Radio Times critic Alison Graham called Ruby "a tiresome by-the-book sort", and the "over-earnest new paramedic" who is "learning how to be a functioning human being rather than a rule-spouting automaton". She also branded her a "hopeless dork" who is "weepy and miserable", "bovine", and the "dopey sidekick" of Iain, The reviewer dubbed her first shift "disastrous". Dainty (Digital Spy) opined that Ruby's first day is "probably up there with the worst", and called it "utterly disastrous". She also described the character as "regimented", with "an acute but endearing lack of social skills". The reporter later said that she hoped the character would not leave as she liked her. Writing about the success of Casualty, Dainty listed Ruby's introduction and the focus on the paramedic team as reasons behind it.

Jones (Inside Soap) dubbed Ruby "meticulous". Sue Haasler, writing for the Metro, expressed her love for Ruby and Hill's portrayal. She commented, "She's completely compelling to watch and she makes Ruby touching and relatable as a young paramedic struggling with the harshest of realities." Haasler thought that Ruby could be "rather judgemental about people". Digital Spy's Sam Warner branded Ruby's stalking story "sinister". Both Haasler and David Brown from the Radio Times likened the story to the plot of Single White Female with Brown naming it "Single White Paramedic". Brown praised the conclusion of the plot. Haasler found Harmony's birth to be "very emotional".

Ammar Kalia of The Guardian included Violette's death in his television highlights for 22 February 2020. Brown called the twist "some rather grim drama". Tasha Hegarty from Digital Spy called the episode "emotionally-charged" and thought Violette's death created a "sad ending" to the story. Both Hegarty and a reporter from the Irish Mirror observed viewers' praise for Hill's performance in the story. The reporter also described the death as "harrowing" and "heartbreaking". The Metro's Calli Kitson thought that Violette's death was one of many stories contributing to "an emotional few weeks in Casualty". Reflecting on Ruby and Violette's relationship, Haasler wrote, "Violette and Ruby's relationship has been shown to be loving but always fraught with distrust and blame on both sides." She praised Hill's performance and thought she portrayed Ruby's mixture of being upset and being professional as she watched the medics try to save Violette well.

Reilly (What's on TV) included Lavender's introduction in the television highlights for 7 March 2020, calling Ruby and Lavender's reconciliation "charged". Hegarty (Digital Spy) noted that viewers were "sad" about Hill's departure, but pleased that she received a "happy ending". Brown thought that Ruby's final shift was awful and found himself "wincing" at the amputation scenes. On the character's exit, Haasler wrote, "it was a happy, carefree exit for a (brilliant) character who's mainly been defined by worrying, overthinking and stressing." She added that Ruby's final shift demonstrated "how far Ruby has come as a paramedic from her early days and what a loss to the service – and the series – she'll be".
