= Maddy Hill =

English actress (born 1990)

- Born: Madeleine Kate Hill; 19 March 1990 (age 36); Haggerston, London, England
- Education: Rose Bruford College
- Occupation: Actress
- Years active: 2012–present
- Television: EastEnders; Casualty

Madeleine Kate Hayley Hill (born 19 March 1990) is an English actress, known for her roles as Nancy Carter in the BBC soap opera EastEnders and Ruby Spark in the BBC medical drama Casualty.

== Career ==
Hill trained at Rose Bruford College drama school. Her first credited acting role was a two episode guest appearance in ITV drama Whitechapel during the third series. She then appeared as a checkout girl in the 2013 film uwantme2killhim? and in the stage productions of As You Like it and The Meeting Place as Phoebe and George respectively.

In October 2013, it was announced that Danny Dyer and Kellie Bright had been cast as Mick and Linda Carter and that they would be taking over The Queen Victoria pub. At the end of the month, it was announced that Mick and Linda's children, Nancy and Johnny, would be played by Hill and Sam Strike respectively. Speaking of her casting Hill said; "I feel incredibly privileged to have been given such an amazing opportunity and I can't wait to start work with such a talented cohort of actors." In 2016, Hill took part in a celebrity version of The Great British Bake Off in aid of Sport Relief. In January 2018, Hill was cast in the BBC medical drama series Casualty as Ruby Spark, a paramedic. Hill began filming in February and her first episode was broadcast on 14 July 2018. In 2020, she departed from her role, with her final scenes airing on 18 April 2020. In February 2021, it was announced that she would be reprising her role of Nancy in EastEnders later in the year.

== Filmography ==
Year	Title	Role	Notes
2012	Whitechapel	Lara Lawrence	2 episodes
2013	Uwantme2killhim?	Checkout girl	Film
2014–2016, 2021–2022, 2024, 2026	EastEnders	Nancy Carter	Series regular
2014	MasterChef	Herself	Guest
2016	The Great Sport Relief Bake Off	Herself	Contestant
2016	Father Brown	Hannah Parkin	Episode: "The Star of Jacob"
2018–2020	Casualty	Ruby Spark	Series regular

== Stage ==
Year	Title	Role	Notes
2012	As You Like It	Phoebe	
2013	The Meeting Place	George	
2016	Imogen	Imogen	Shakespeare's Globe Theatre.

== Awards and nominations ==
Year	Organisation	Award	Work	Result	Ref.
2014	The British Soap Awards	Best Newcomer	Nancy Carter in EastEnders	Won	
2014	Inside Soap Awards	Best Newcomer	Nancy Carter in EastEnders	Shortlisted	
2014	TV Choice Awards	Best Newcomer	Nancy Carter in EastEnders	Shortlisted	
2014	Telly Spy Awards	Best Newcomer	Nancy Carter in EastEnders	Won	
2014	Digital Spy Reader Awards	Best Newcomer	Nancy Carter in EastEnders	Won	
2015	National Television Awards	Best Newcomer	Nancy Carter in EastEnders	Won	
2015	Inside Soap Awards	Best Partnership	Nancy Carter and Tamwar Masood in EastEnders	Shortlisted	
