= Shaheen Jafargholi =

Welsh actor and singer (born 1997)

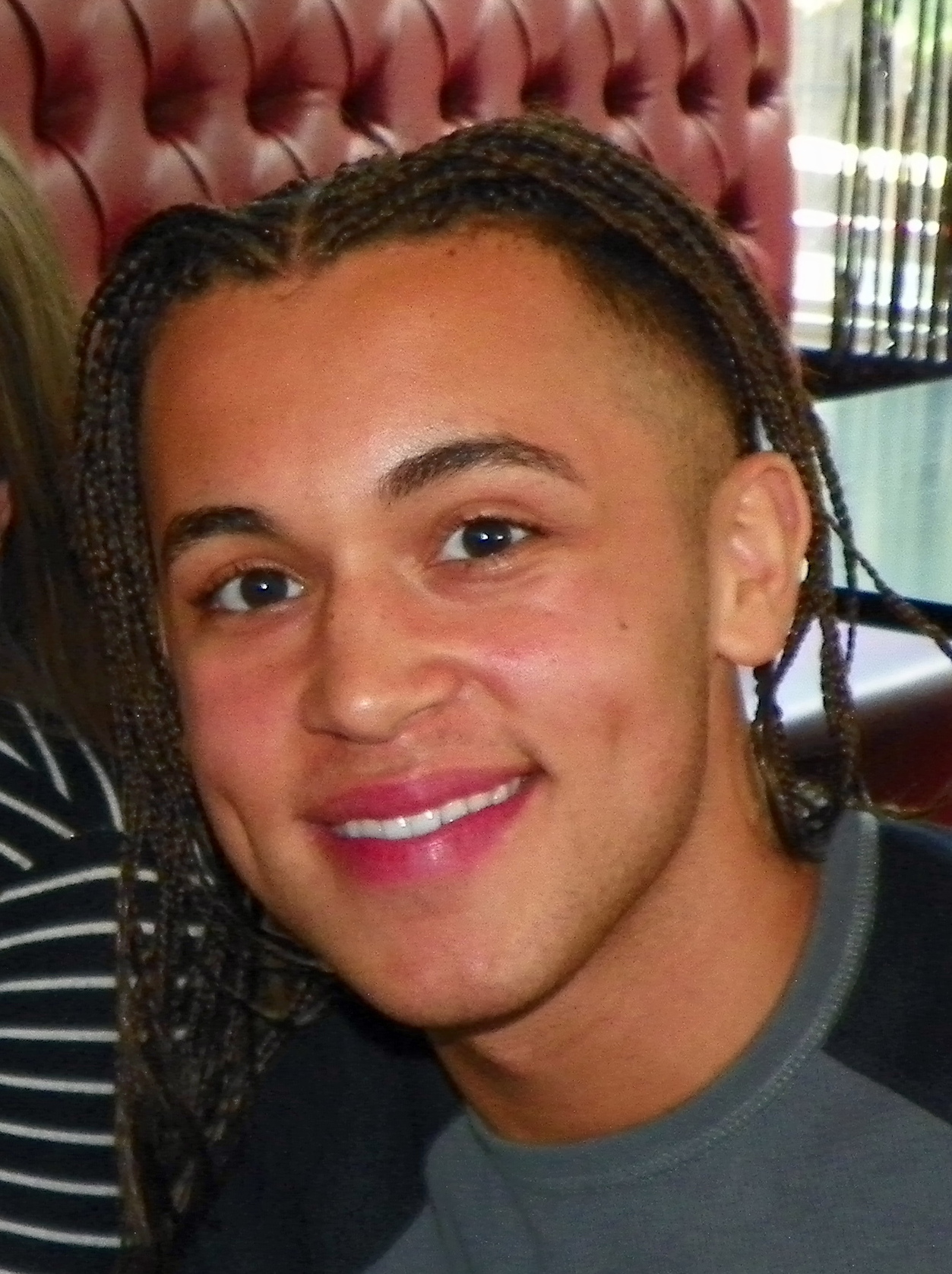
- Jafargholi in 2016
- Born: 23 January 1997 (age 29); Swansea, Wales
- Occupations: Actor; singer
- Years active: 2004–present
- Musical career
- Genres: Pop
- Instrument: Vocals
- Labels: Island; Beady Eye; Grinnin'

Shaheen Jafargholi (Persian: شاهین جعفرقلی; born 23 January 1997) is a Welsh actor and singer. In 2009, he finished in seventh place on the ITV competition series Britain's Got Talent. Since then, he has portrayed the roles of Shakil Kazemi in EastEnders (2016–2018) and Marty Kirkby in Casualty (2018–2023). He also appeared as Billy in the BBC Three horror comedy series Wreck (2023) and as Celyn in the BBC One miniseries Lost Boys and Fairies (2024). In 2027 he will play Fabian Salah in season 2 of the Crave series Heated Rivalry.

== Early life ==
Shaheen Jafargholi was born on 23 January 1997, at Singleton Hospital, Swansea, Wales. His mother Karen Thomas is Welsh, while his father is Iranian.

== Career ==
=== Child acting ===
In 2009, Jafargholi portrayed the recurring role of Troy in the children's television series Grandpa in My Pocket. He has also acted in the Torchwood episode "Greeks Bearing Gifts" playing Danny – the child of a crazed gun-wielding father and took part in an episode of the medical drama series Casualty playing Christy Skinner, a patient with incurable hiccups. Jafargholi has also toured on stage as a young Michael Jackson in Thriller – Live.

Minor work includes UK touring productions of Macbeth (character – Son of Macduff), The King and I and Joseph and the Amazing Technicolor Dreamcoat (choir). He has also performed as the Genie of the Lamp in Aladdin. He appeared, un-credited, in Mine All Mine, A Way of Life and a short film called Day at the Beach. Minor TV appearances include The Frank Skinner Show, Nickelodeon UK and ITV Wales News in which he was involved in the celebration to switch on the Christmas lights in Swansea city centre in front of 30,000 people. Jafargholi has also taken part in advertisements for Delta Air Lines, Debenhams and DFS. A planned Walkers Crisps advert with ex-footballer Gary Lineker was cancelled.

=== Britain's Got Talent ===
In 2009, Jafargholi took part in Britain's Got Talent, series 3, episode 2. His first audition song was a cover of the Amy Winehouse version of The Zutons song, "Valerie". Simon Cowell ended the song after two lines and remarked: "You got this really wrong." Unusually, Cowell requested that Jafargholi sing another song, as he felt the first song did not suit Jafargholi. After a moment of hesitation, Jafargholi rallied and sang Smokey Robinson's "Who's Lovin' You", based upon the Jackson 5 recording. This performance was highly credited by the audience and the judges, earning a standing ovation.

Jafargholi's previous experience has led to criticism by some fans of Britain's Got Talent as they believe the competition should be open to amateurs only. In response, a spokesman for the show said: "Britain's Got Talent is open to everyone whether they are a professional or an amateur. What Shaheen has done in the past has no bearing on his role on Britain's Got Talent."

As a result of his appearance in the talent contest, Jafargholi was signed to present a one-hour show on his local radio station Bay Radio. Broadcast director Andy Griffiths, said: "Shaheen will take centre stage in our bank holiday schedule. He will present it himself, picking his favourite songs, talking about his experiences on the show and offering advice to other kids on how they can succeed."

For the semi-final Jafargholi chose "And I Am Telling You I'm Not Going" from the musical Dreamgirls. When the judges were about to choose the second place between Jafargholi and dance troupe MD Showgroup, Simon Cowell chose MD Showgroup, but Amanda Holden and Piers Morgan selected Jafargholi. During the final on 30 May 2009, Jafargholi performed "Who's Lovin' You", the song which he had sung during his audition, and received a standing ovation from the audience. He finished in 7th place.

=== Post Talent ===
Jafargholi sang "I'll Be There" at the 2009 MOBO Awards in September, during the ceremony's tribute to Michael Jackson. A month later, he flew to Chicago to tape an episode of The Oprah Winfrey Show performing "Who's Lovin' You", which aired on 14 October. He later performed "Lean on Me" and "Who's Lovin' You" at the BBC Children in Need Gala in Cardiff and the BBC Switch Live event at the Hammersmith Apollo in November 2009, as well as The Ellen DeGeneres Show where he performed "I'll Be There", that aired a month later. On 29 September 2010, Jafargholi performed at the "Welcome to Wales" concert for the Ryder Cup Jafargholi performed in the Britain's Got Talent tour where he performed "I Want You Back" by the Jackson 5. He sang the song while being accompanied onstage by Dancers, Aidan Davis and Perri Luc Kiely and Mitchell Craske from Diversity.

==== Michael Jackson memorial ====
After performing on the Britain's Got Talent tour, Jafargholi sang a musical tribute of "Who's Lovin' You" on stage at the Los Angeles Staples Center, at 7 July 2009 globally televised funeral memorial service for the "King of Pop" Michael Jackson. He had been originally invited to perform with Jackson in his This Is It series of London concerts. His performance was preceded by the eulogy from the song's writer, Smokey Robinson. Following Jafargholi's tribute, Larry King leaned forward and asked Motown founder Berry Gordy, "Who is that?". Gordy, who, according to King, was moved by the performance, reportedly replied, "I have no cotton pickin' idea who that is, but if I were [still] in the business, I would sign him tomorrow."

=== Debut album ===
In September 2010, Jafargholi announced details for his debut album and single. A double A-side single of "Last Train Home", written by Vince Kidd and Paul Staveley O'Duffy and produced by Paul Staveley O'Duffy and "Hip Teens" (also produced by O'Duffy) was due to be released on 22 November 2010. A press release described "Last Train Home" as an "original string-soaked ballad with a nod to an era gone by", while "Hip Teens" is a cover of soul group Frank Popp's 2007 hit "Hip Teens (Don't Wear Blue Jeans)". Videos were shot for both tracks. The album was to be called When I Come of Age, and was said to be a mixture of original material and rare '60s soul covers. Jafargholi collaborated with top US producers Jerry Duplessis and Igloo & TC (best known for their work with Whitney Houston, The Black Eyed Peas and Backstreet Boys) and UK producers Paul Staveley O'Duffy, Jimmy Hogarth and Martin Terefe for the album.

In November, it was announced that the single and album were being delayed until March 2011 "due to huge international interest and some exciting overseas opportunities", but to date they have never been released.

=== Adult acting career ===
In 2014, Jafargholi performed as the Genie in The New Victoria Theatre's pantomime, Aladdin. In May 2016, Jafargholi joined the cast of the BBC soap opera, EastEnders, portraying Shakil Kazemi. His character was killed off two years later in May 2018 in a controversial knife-crime storyline where Shakil was stabbed and killed by a gang. On 1 August 2018, it was announced that Jafargholi had joined the cast of Casualty as nurse Marty Kirkby. After five years on the series, he made his final appearance on 18 March 2023.

On 25 August 2026, it was announced that Jafargholi would play Fabian Salah in the second season of Heated Rivalry.

== Filmography ==
Year	Title	Role	Notes
2004	Casualty	Christy Skinner	Episode: "Inside Out"
2006	Torchwood	Danny	Episode: "Greeks Bearing Gifts"
2009	Grandpa in My Pocket	Troy	Recurring role
2016–2018	EastEnders	Shakil Kazemi	Series regular
2018–2023	Casualty	Marty Kirkby	Series regular
2019, 2020	Holby City	Marty Kirkby	2 episodes
2023	Wreck	Billy Ahmadi	Series 2
2024	Lost Boys and Fairies	Celyn	Miniseries
2025	In Flight	Jordan Black	Main cast
2026	The Agency: Central Intelligence	Zak	2 episodes
2026	War	Saeed Masood	Main cast
2027	Heated Rivalry †	Fabian Salah	Series 2

== Discography ==
=== Studio albums ===
Title	Album details
When I Come of Age	Unreleased; Label: Island; Formats: CD, Digital Download
Acoustic	Released: 8 December 2014; Label: Grinnin' Records; Formats: Digital Download

=== Single ===
Song	Year	Album
"Last Train Home/Hip Teens"	2011	When I Come of Age

== Awards and nominations ==
Year	Award	Category	Nominated work	Result	Ref.
2016	Inside Soap Award	Best Newcomer	EastEnders	Longlisted	
2016	Digital Spy Reader Awards	Best Newcomer	EastEnders	Third	
2020	Inside Soap Awards	Best Drama Star	Casualty	Longlisted	
