= Jack Nolan (actor) =

Irish actor

- Born: Dublin, Ireland
- Education: Dublin Institute of Technology
- Occupation: Actor
- Years active: 2015–present
- Television: Red Rock; Casualty

Jack Nolan is an Irish actor, known for his role as Michael Hennessy on the Virgin drama series Red Rock (2015-2018) and Will Noble on the BBC medical drama Casualty (2019–2021).

== Filmography ==
Year	Title	Role	Notes
2015	The Three Sisters	Pub Flirt	
2015–2018	Red Rock	Michael Hennessy	Series regular
2017	Kissing Candice	Wolfman	TV series
2017	Younger	Declan	Episode: "Irish Goodbye"
2017	Vikings	Earl Jorgensen	2 episodes
2019–2021	Casualty	Will Noble	Series regular (52 episodes)

== Awards and nominations ==
Year	Award	Category	Result	Ref(s)
2020	National Television Awards	Newcomer	Longlisted	
