= Casualty series 35 =

Thirty-fifth series of Casualty

Casualty
- Series 35
- Starring: William Beck; Di Botcher; Olivia D'Lima; Jason Durr; Uriel Emil; Amanda Henderson; Adele James; Shaheen Jafargholi; Gabriella Leon; Bobby Lockwood; Tony Marshall; Amanda Mealing; Kirsty Mitchell; Neet Mohan; Jack Nolan; Osi Okerafor; George Rainsford; Jacey Sallés; Michael Stevenson; Derek Thompson; Charles Venn
- No. of episodes: 30

Release
- Original network: BBC One; BBC One HD
- Original release: 2 January – 7 August 2021

Series chronology
- ← Previous; Series 34 Next → Series 36

The thirty-fifth series of the British medical drama television series Casualty commenced airing in the United Kingdom on BBC One on 2 January 2021 and finished on 7 August 2021. The series consists of 30 episodes, which focus on the professional and personal lives of medical and ancillary staff at the emergency department (ED) of the fictional Holby City Hospital. Loretta Preece continues her role as series producer. Sixteen regular cast members reprised their roles from the previous series and actor Michael Stevenson returned to the serial in episode fourteen as Iain Dean, a paramedic.

Production for the series began in September 2020 following a six-month hiatus in response to the COVID-19 pandemic. To protect cast and crew in the pandemic, new production protocols were implemented, including two-metre distancing at all times. This meant new filming techniques were used, including the use of plate shots and green screens. Costume and makeup also presented a challenge; personal protective equipment (PPE) became part of the costume, but face coverings did not as producers believed they limited emotion. Cast had to apply their own makeup and makeup-created injuries were stopped. Despite the reduction in other areas of production, stunts continued to be arranged as they were deemed integral to the format of the show and were often easier to arrange than swapping props.

The series explores the impact of the pandemic on ED staff and to truthfully portray the topic, discussions about how political Casualty could become occurred with Tim Davie, the Director-General of the BBC. Producers wanted the series to reflect the new landscape of the National Health Service (NHS). A special episode examining the pandemic in detail was commissioned as the series opener. Preece wanted the episode to do those closely impacted by the pandemic justice. The early series continues to explore the pandemic with a regular character dying from the virus and also progresses stories from the previous series.

== Production ==
The series commences in the United Kingdom on 2 January 2021 on BBC One and airs on Saturday nights. It was produced by BBC Studios. Loretta Preece continues her role as series producer. The series consists of 30 episodes. Production for series 35 commenced in September 2020, following a six-month hiatus after production was suspended in light of the COVID-19 pandemic. Consequently, the show took multiple transmission breaks during the previous series to spread episodes out across the year. Kate Oates, the head of continuing drama at BBC Studios, expressed her delight at resuming filming and to returning to transmission. Due to new techniques implemented in production, episode runtimes for the series were shortened from the usual 50 minutes to 40 minutes. Despite this, the opening episode airs for 54 minutes. Following new nationwide restrictions in November 2020, it was confirmed that Casualty would continue filming and would not pause production again.

=== Promotion ===
The series was promoted through multiple trailers and each episode received a preview clip before broadcast. A promotional trailer for the series was released on 16 December 2020 and features segments from the early episodes of the series. As well as previewing new and continuing stories, the trailer revealed stunts featured in the series, including an exploded bomb and an ambulance crashing into a river. To further promote the new series, a Christmas-themed video of the cast, led by George Rainsford, was released on 17 December 2020. A mid-series trailer was released on 12 March 2021 featuring scenes from new and continuing stories. On 9 July 2021, Casualty released a promotional trailer for the final five episodes of the series. Megan Davies from Digital Spy thought the trailer was "action-packed" in the run up to an "explosive" series finale.

=== Filming ===
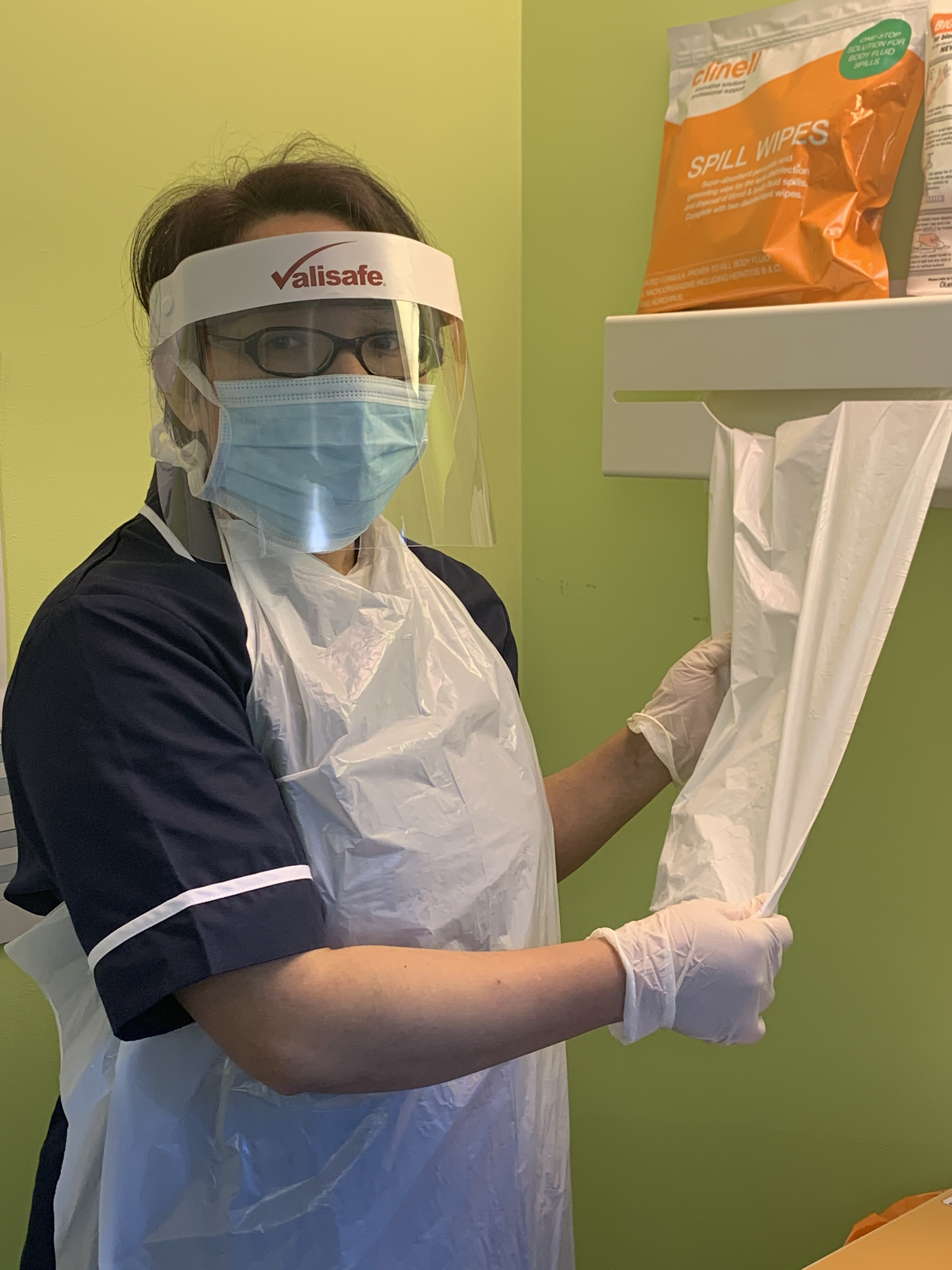
Characters used PPE, as worn by a nurse (pictured), as their costume.

Production protocols were enforced to maintain the safety of the cast and crew. Additionally, the physical distancing measures enforced by the British government were adhered to. The measures require cast and crew to maintain a two-metre distance at all times. Preece told Sophie Dainty of Digital Spy that this was challenging as the show works on "close contact medicine, stunts and emotional exchanges", which was hard to film while adhering to physical distancing measures. To maintain distancing in scenes with multiple characters, plate shots were filmed. Each shot includes different actors, stood distanced, and in post-production, the shots were edited together to make it appear like one shot. Green screens were also used to make actors appear closer together than they were allowed to be. Producer Mat McHale confirmed that the difference would not be noticeable on-screen. Preece reiterated this and promised that the show had not "comprised" on its quality as a result of changes to filming.

During production, producers faced a challenge of face masks, which are compulsory in hospitals. Preece believed that after much exploration, these masks limited the emotion of scenes, so they were not worn all the time. Since the drama is set in a hospital, characters used personal protective equipment (PPE) as part of their costume. To avoid using NHS resources, Casualty sourced their PPE from an alternative supplier and despite this, it maintains effectiveness, allowing them to occasionally breach the physical distancing measures. Due to the protocols enforced, cast were required to apply their own makeup with verbal support from the makeup artists. The show regularly uses makeup-created injuries, such as cuts and bruises, but this was stopped due to the new protection measures. Additionally, to film kissing scenes, the show hired the partners of the actors to be body doubles. Oates was keen to not stop the stunts involved in the drama as she believed they were integral to its formula. Preece revealed that much "planning and innovative thinking" had gone into the stunts, ensuring that the show's "trademark stunts" were unaltered. Oates and Preece agreed that often, stunts were easier to arrange than swapping props, due to the time and money involved in them.

=== Storyline development ===
Series 35 explores the impact of the COVID-19 pandemic on staff in emergency departments, maintaining the drama's tradition of "[reflecting] the difficult realities of the NHS". Preece felt it was hard to reflect the pandemic from a planning perspective as they could not predict the impact it had on EDs. To accommodate the new stories, all pre-existing scripts were scrapped and the pre-planned stories were rewritten. Oates explained that the decision was taken as the previous material "[would not] have felt relevant". Oates was pleased to portray stories which "reflect the extraordinary times we are living through". She entered discussions with Tim Davie, the Director-General of the BBC, about how political Casualty could be about the pandemic, as it is one of his concerns; he permitted in-character political statements. Oates was pleased with this as she did not believe the show could be "truthful" without that and also feared it could make the show "boring". She wanted the show to reflect new landscape of the NHS and hoped that it would spark new topical conversations. She commented, "Hopefully, on shows like ours, we can make those social points at the same time as our heroes are seen in their best Avengers style embracing the same kind of life-or-death situations they always have."

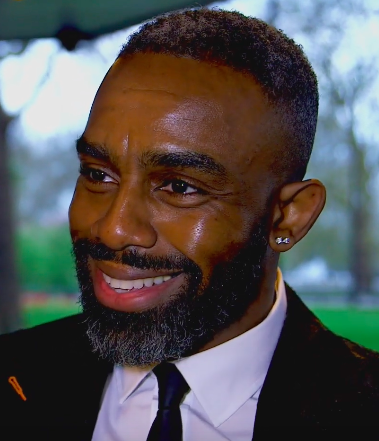
Charles Venn, who portrays Jacob Masters, believed the episode was vital for reflecting the pandemic.

A special episode examining the pandemic in detail was commissioned to open the series. The episode is billed as "one of [Casualty's] most powerful episodes to date" and explores clinical lead Connie Beauchamp (Amanda Mealing) managing the department with support from senior nurses Jacob Masters (Charles Venn) and Charlie Fairhead (Derek Thompson), consultant Will Noble (Jack Nolan) becoming disillusioned with the NHS, and paramedic Fenisha Khatri (Olivia D'Lima) trying to protect her unborn baby. The episode is set between March and summer 2020, across the first wave of the pandemic. The episode was announced on 7 September 2020, with further details, including a promotional image, released on 10 December 2020. The story team worked with medical advisors to accurately portray the experiences of medics and front-line workers. Venn felt it was vital to reflect the pandemic through this episode. He told Joe Anderton of Digital Spy, "It would be remiss of us not to acknowledge that. I don't want to say we are paying homage, but for everyone who has lost loved ones during this time, it was a must. It would be very strange to ignore it." He dubbed the episode "a real tearjerker and a real rollercoaster". Preece was proud of the episode and felt it was important to showcase the impact on EDs. She commented, "We knew we had to do medics, COVID victims and survivors and their relations justice and I strongly believe that we have."

Writers concluded and progressed stories from the previous series. This occurs in early episodes, which were set in summer and autumn 2020. Preece noted that this allows Casualty to continue exploring stories including Fenisha's pregnancy, a love triangle between Dylan Keogh (William Beck), Faith Cadogan (Kirsty Mitchell) and Lev Malinovsky (Uriel Emil), and Connie and Jacob's romance. She added that writers wanted to explore the complications of Fenisha's pregnancy due to the baby's father, Ethan Hardy (George Rainsford), having Huntington's disease. Other stories further explored from the previous series are Charlie's grief, following the death of his wife, and nurse Jade Lovall's (Gabriella Leon) deafness. The latter was explored in a special episode in the previous series with focus moving to the challenges of lip reading with PPE and masks in this series.

Producers made the pandemic a recurring theme throughout the rest of the series, but were keen for it to not dominate stories. On this, Preece commented that Casualty "offers the audience a slice of Saturday night escapism". Mealing added that the audience have lived through it and do not want to revisit it weekly. In the series, the health impacts of COVID-19 were explored through the characters of Jacob and Dylan, who both contract the virus. Noel Garcia (Tony Marshall), a receptionist in the ED, also contracts the virus and is killed off, making it the first episode of a soap in the United Kingdom to portray the death of a character from the virus. Preece thought that his death would be "impactful" and felt it reflected those who have died from the virus: they all "have been treasured by colleagues and [...] have families who love them". While the death of a regular character had been announced prior to transmission, Marshall's departure had been embargoed. Writers used the character's death to set up new stories. Mealing explained that her character Connie would take "personal responsibility" for the death and would struggle in the aftermath, viewing it as "her failing".

The show's story team also created new stories for the series. One story focuses on "new territory" for paramedic Jan Jenning (Di Botcher) and her police officer wife Ffion Morgan (Stirling Gallacher). A new plot was also created for nurse Marty Kirkby (Shaheen Jafargholi), billed by Preece as different from his other stories. The story explores the issue of pelvic mesh implants through the character of Marty's mother, Bibi Kirkby (Fisun Burgess), after she has vaginal mesh surgery. Marty feels that the private clinic who operated on Bibi have "betrayed" her. Scriptwriters requested the help of Kate Sansom, from the campaign group Sling the Mesh, for the storyline. She expressed her gratitude that Casualty were covering the subject and felt the show could help raise further awareness. A show spokesman confirmed the story is not based on real-life events and that the research team had worked with "a range of experts and medical advisers" to ensure the story was portrayed sensitively. A story for the character of Jade began mid-series when she is spiked and attacked on a night out. She is "traumatised" by the event and questions whether she was targeted because of her disability. Leon found the plot challenging to film and hoped that it would raise awareness about drink-spiking and the spiker being the issue behind it.

Plans for the series finale were first teased by Rainsford in an April 2021 interview with Digital Spy's Sophie Dainty. He explained that the episode would include stunts and described it as "one of those big Casualty ensemble pieces with an event which pulls together lots of the cast". The episode builds towards the next series, which celebrates the serial's thirty-fifth anniversary.

== Cast ==
The thirty-fifth series of Casualty features a cast of characters working for the NHS within the emergency department of Holby City Hospital and the Holby Ambulance Service. Most cast members from the previous series reprise their roles in this series. William Beck appears as Dylan Keogh, a consultant in emergency medicine, while Di Botcher portrays Jan Jenning, the operational duty manager at Holby Ambulance Service. Olivia D'Lima stars as Fenisha Khatri, a paramedic, and Jason Durr features as David Hide, a senior staff nurse. Uriel Emil plays paramedic Lev Malinovsky, and Amanda Henderson appears as staff nurse Robyn Miller. Shaheen Jafargholi and Gabriella Leon reprise their roles as staff nurses Marty Kirkby and Jade Lovall, respectively. Tony Marshall features as Noel Garcia, a receptionist, and Amanda Mealing portrays Connie Beauchamp, the department's clinical lead and a consultant in emergency medicine. Kirsty Mitchell stars as Faith Cadogan, an advanced clinical practitioner (ACP), and Neet Mohan appears as Rash Masum, a F1 doctor. Jack Nolan portrays Will Noble, a consultant in pediatric emergency medicine, and George Rainsford plays consultant Ethan Hardy. Original cast member Derek Thompson appears as Charlie Fairhead, a senior charge nurse and emergency nurse practitioner. Charles Venn stars as Jacob Masters, the department's clinical nurse manager. Additionally, three cast members feature in a recurring capacity: Harry Collett appears as Oliver Hide, the son of David, Stirling Gallacher plays Ffion Morgan, a police officer, and Jacey Sallés portrays Rosa Cadenas, a healthcare assistant.

Mealing confirmed on 24 December 2020 that a regular character would be killed off in the opening episode after contracting coronavirus. The episode features the death of Noel, whose identity was embargoed until transmission. Preece called Marshall, who has appeared in the show since 2008, "a much loved member of the behind-the-scenes Casualty family" and expressed her sadness at the character's death. She added that many people cried when filming Marshall's final scenes and that he would be missed. Nolan's departure from the series was revealed on 31 December 2020, and Will departs in the third episode. In March 2021, it was confirmed that at Mealing's request, Connie would depart the series, after a seven-year stint. The exit was reported to be a temporary break. Mealing expressed her delight at playing Connie and felt that the character was revolutionary for women. Deborah Sathe, the senior head of content production at BBC Studios, praised Connie and Mealing, in particular for her work following the show's return to filming. Connie departs in the thirteenth episode after deciding to be closer to her daughter in America.

The casting of actor Bobby Lockwood in the role of paramedic Leon Cook was announced on 16 December 2020. He is billed as "handsome, charming, loveable" whose "endless excitement" can cause tension with some colleagues. Lockwood expressed his pride at representing front line workers in his role. Preece was pleased with Lockwood's casting and liked the character. She opined that both Lockwood and Leon have "the most extraordinary comic timing". Leon first appears in the second episode. In April 2021, it was confirmed that the character would leave the series; he departs in episode 17. Leon departs after failing to secure a permanent position at the ambulance service. Preece thanked Lockwood for his work and suggested that the character could return in the future. On 20 May 2021, it was announced that Osi Okerafor had been cast as Matthew Afolami, an experienced locum registrar. His backstory states that he was in a relationship with Fenisha, which creates drama in her ongoing romance with Ethan. Okerafor liked his character's patient care. Preece was pleased to have Okerafor, who she described as "handsome and debonair, sensitive and steadfast, passionate and unpredictable", join the cast. She added that the actor's "beautifully layered" performance created a character who is "far more than a classic romantic leading man". Matthew first appears in episode 22.

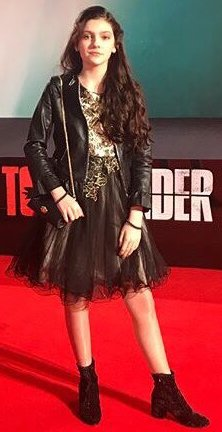
Emily Carey reprised her role as Grace Beauchamp-Strachan in the series.

Preece confirmed that multiple former cast members would return to Casualty during the series. She expressed her delight at the returns and revealed that one return would "[come] from a very unexpected direction". Emily Carey reprises her recurring role as Grace Beauchamp-Strachan, the daughter of Connie, in the series. Her return was confirmed in a promotional trailer released on 16 December 2020. The character last appeared in series 32. Preece said that Grace returns "beautiful and forthright" with a wish to be "appreciated" by Connie. She also expressed her delight at Carey's return and looked forward to exploring her character's new stories. Grace returns in episode 7, and departs alongside Mealing in episode 13. On 17 December 2020, it was announced that actor Michael Stevenson had reprised his role as paramedic Iain Dean, following his departure in the previous series. Stevenson expressed his delight and looked forward to exploring stories for Iain. The character returns in episode 14. After a guest stint in the previous series, actress Adele James returned in episode five as Tina Mollett, an agency nurse. She becomes involved in a relationship with Jacob. James' agent confirmed that she had been promoted to the regular cast. The return of Ciaran Coulson, portrayed by Rick Warden, was announced on 12 March 2021. Warden played Ciaran in series 33. The character is reintroduced in episode nineteen as part of Marty's story. It emerges that he is the chief executive officer (CEO) of the private health clinic which Marty is taking to court.

The series features several recurring characters and multiple guest stars. It was announced on 3 February 2020 that Chris Gordon would reprise his role as Ross West, the son of Jan, as part of "a huge and terrifying story" involving the character and Ffion. He returns in episode nine, and departs in episode seventeen. In October 2020, Gallacher revealed, via Twitter, that comedian Rosie Jones would guest star in an episode of the series. She portrays patient Paula Kettering. Preece confirmed that she would appear in the ninth episode and the role would showcase a "whole new side" of Jones. She added that her character would appear with Jan. Lollie McKenzie reprised her guest role as Natalia Malinovsky, the daughter of Faith and Lev, in episode two. Mitchell confirmed that Natalia would return as part of a bigger story in the series. McKenzie appeared again in episode twelve. Episode five features an appearance from Philip Wright as Graham Kirkby, the father of Marty. He has appeared on a recurring basis since series 33. Kriss Dosanjh reprises his role in episode 13 as Rash's father, Ashok Masum; he previously appeared in series 34. Graham returns in the fifteenth episode, alongside Marty's mother, Bibi Kirkby, who is portrayed by Fisun Burgess. The character previously appeared in series 33, played by Badria Timimi.

=== Main characters ===
- William Beck as Dylan Keogh
- Di Botcher as Jan Jenning
- Olivia D'Lima as Fenisha Khatri (until episode 30)
- Jason Durr as David Hide
- Uriel Emil as Lev Malinovsky (until episode 30)
- Amanda Henderson as Robyn Miller
- Shaheen Jafargholi as Marty Kirkby
- Adele James as Christina "Tina" Mollett (from episode 5)
- Gabriella Leon as Jade Lovall
- Bobby Lockwood as Leon Cook (episodes 2−17)
- Tony Marshall as Noel Garcia (until episode 1)
- Amanda Mealing as Connie Beauchamp (until episode 13)
- Kirsty Mitchell as Faith Cadogan
- Neet Mohan as Rash Masum
- Jack Nolan as Will Noble (until episode 3)
- Osi Okerafor as Matthew Afolami (from episode 22)
- George Rainsford as Ethan Hardy
- Michael Stevenson as Iain Dean (from episode 14)
- Derek Thompson as Charlie Fairhead
- Charles Venn as Jacob Masters

=== Recurring characters ===
- Emily Carey as Grace Beauchamp-Strachan (episodes 7−13)
- Harry Collett as Oliver Hide
- Stirling Gallacher as Ffion Morgan
- Lollie McKenzie as Natalia Malinovsky
- Jacey Sallés as Rosa Cadenas
- Rick Warden as Ciaran Coulson

=== Guest characters ===
- Leslie Ash as Vanessa Lytton
- Fisun Burgess as Bibi Kirkby
- Kriss Dosanjh as Ashok Masum
- Chris Gordon as Ross West
- Rosie Jones as Paula Kettering
- Philip Wright as Graham Kirkby

== Episodes ==
No. overall	No. in series	Episode	Directed by	Written by	Original release date	UK viewers (millions)
1183	1	Episode 1	Steve Hughes	Kevin Rundle	2 January 2021	N/A (<5.19) (Note: Not reported in the weekly top 15 programmes for four-screen viewer ratings.)
June 2020: The ED responds to the COVID-19 pandemic when their case numbers rise. Will complains to Connie about the lack of resources and how they have all been working long hours, and she agrees that the NHS was already "on its knees" before the pandemic. Fenisha lies to Jan that she is asthmatic so that she can shield without having to disclose her pregnancy. In order to do more to help the frontline, Rosa changes roles and becomes a healthcare assistant. Jade struggles to understand people when they are wearing masks, as she cannot read their lips and therefore, her role at the hospital changes to accompanying patients while they die. Connie and Jacob clash when he demands she investigate how ethnic minorities are more at risk of contracting the virus but she counters that there simply isn't enough time. Dylan, Jacob and Noel contract coronavirus. To protect their son Luka Malinovsky (Tom Mulheron), who has cancer and is shielding, Faith stops working and stays at home, while Lev moves out of the family home so he can continue working. Though Dylan and Jacob recover, Noel is placed on a life support machine; Connie breaks down to Charlie and admits that she blames herself for not adequately protecting her staff. Charlie explains that he feels guilty for sending an elderly patient back to her carehome without testing her for COVID-19 because she returned to the ED and died. Connie is reluctant to call Noel's family, but Charlie convinces her that she should do it; they agree to turn off his life support machine and he dies with Connie at his side. Connie then tells the team, who agree to continue working in Noel's honour.
1184	2	Episode 2	Ruth Carney	Oliver Frampton	9 January 2021	N/A (<5.28)
Summer 2020: New paramedic Leon makes a bad first impression on Jan when he mistakes her for a cleaner. Will continues to challenge the hospital's procedures and disagrees with Connie's decision to call the police about a child abusing his mother; he then resigns from his job. Faith is welcomed back to work by her colleagues, but Dylan is hostile with her. Lev moves back home and Faith mentions that Dylan accused him of having an affair with a man; Lev does not deny it and instead, he begs Faith not to break up their family. Connie struggles in the aftermath of Noel's death and is told that his memorial needs removing from the ED entrance; she asks Rosa to move it to the peace garden. She becomes upset when she reads a card from Noel's daughter, Honey Wright (Chelsee Healey), telling the team not to blame themselves; Jacob reads the card to the team. When Jacob confronts Connie for working too hard and not accepting his support, she cancels their plans and ends their relationship.
1185	3	Episode 3	Andy Newbery	Colin Bytheway	16 January 2021	N/A (<4.65)
Summer 2020: On his last day, Will tries to make peace with the rest of his colleagues. Following a heated meeting with Connie, Will tells Ethan that he is going to ask Fenisha to leave with him to Ireland. However, Fenisha informs Will of her pregnancy and the fact that she loves Ethan. Will helps Fenisha see that she needs to tell Ethan about the pregnancy before making peace with Connie and leaving the department. Before Fenisha has a chance though, Ethan discovers she is pregnant and refuses to talk to her. Robyn makes an effort to help a patient, and notes that it is the first time since the beginning of the pandemic that she has been able to help a patient on a personal level. Rash strives to get a date with ITU consultant Enalia, who later reveals that she is in an open marriage, and Rash declines her advances.
1186	4	Episode 4	Andy Newbery	Hilary Frankland	23 January 2021	N/A (<4.87)
Autumn 2020: Ethan confides in Rash about Fenisha's pregnancy, and he states that he is not ready to have children. A confused Rash questions him until Ethan tells him about having the Huntington's gene. Ethan informs Fenisha that he wants no involvement with the baby, and does not tell her about the gene. Faith, Dylan and a paramedic called Pravi head out to another hospital to collect a transfer patient, until a lorry collides with the ambulance. Pravi is killed instantly from the impact, and the ambulance is left hanging over the edge of a large body of water. Due to the shift of weight moving would cause, Faith has to stay inside of the ambulance while Dylan attempts to find help. Lev tracks her location on his phone and arrives at the ambulance, where he pulls her out seconds before the ambulance falls into the water. After Faith is taken into hospital, Lev punches Dylan.
1187	5	Episode 5	Steve M Kelly	Simon Norman	30 January 2021	N/A (<4.60)
Autumn 2020: Roy Scaddon (Alan Williams) enters the hospital wearing an explosive belt, intending on avenging his wife's death, which he blames Jacob for. Roy believes that Jacob does not care for her death, until he recites memories of her from when he treated her. He then tells Jacob to run away, before he activates the explosives. In the aftermath Connie attempts to tell Jacob how she really feels, however, she is left devastated when Jacob goes to the pub with nurse Tina. While the staff are dealing with Roy, Marty is left to care for a patient. His father Graham, who is in hospital after sawing his finger off, accompanies and supports Marty when he has to decompress the patient's chest.
1188	6	Episode 6	Steve M Kelly	Dana Fainaru	6 February 2021	N/A (<4.81)
Autumn 2020: After visiting a case of domestic abuse, a patient accidentally reveals to Jan that Fenisha is pregnant. An angry Jan confronts her on why she kept it private for so long, and Fenisha responds that she did not feel comfortable telling her, due to her harsh nature. David's car breaks down, and when the repair company are unable to come out and fix it, Leon fixes it for him. Marty overhears Lev and Faith talking about Lev cheating on her with a man, and later provides him with support for his situation. However, Lev responds with anger, claiming that he does not want to be anything like Marty.
1189	7	Episode 7	John Maidens	Katerina Watson and Hilary Frankland	13 February 2021	4.38
Winter 2020: Fenisha brings in Amber, a patient that she finds on the street, who has a head injury. While on the ward, she asks Ethan to go shopping for prams with her, but he reaffirms that he does not want to be emotionally involved with the baby. While the pair argue, Amber leaves and Fenisha follows her to the woods. Ethan calls her to apologise, and he hears Fenisha groaning from what she believes are Braxton Hicks contractions, and he goes to the woods to find her in labour. After contacting Jan for an ambulance, Ethan gets his foot caught in a trap and coaches her during the birth. Once at the hospital, he informs her that he is open to the idea of being a family unit, but Fenisha states that she does not need his help, since she cannot rely on him. Grace accompanies Connie to work, and while at the hospital, she suffers flashbacks to when she was involved in a road traffic accident and subsequent helicopter crash at the hospital. Grace tries to tell Connie how she is feeling, but she is too busy with work on the ward.
1190	8	Episode 8	John Maidens	Stephen McAteer	20 February 2021	N/A (<4.54)
When Fenisha comes into the ward with her baby, Ethan begins to worry that it is related to his Huntington's diagnosis. He confides in Connie that he wants to tell her about it, but she advises that it is best to tell her at a later date, so she does not worry about her child's fate for 18 years; the age he could be tested. Grace meets Leon, and the pair flirt after she lies about her age. She takes him home, and when they are about to have sex, Connie walks in and throws him out.
1191	9	Episode 9	Julie Edwards	Dana Fainaru	27 February 2021	N/A (<4.68)
Jan learns that Ross has been admitted into the hospital, and goes to visit him. He explains that while in prison, a group of inmates learned that he is a former drug dealer, and request the details of his dealing contacts; when he refused. He tells Jan that the inmates want her to pay them monthly instalments, but feeling he is using her, Jan refuses. When Ross learns that he is being sent back to prison, he slams his head into the wall to stay in hospital. When Jan sees how badly he does not want to return to the prison, she decides to support him. Marty wants to further his position at the hospital, to which Faith offers to let him shadow her. While she is overseeing Marty treating a patient's eye, Lev comes onto the ward to argue with Dylan. She leaves Marty to tend to Lev, and while she is away, glue seeps into the patient's eye. Jacob oversees the rest of the treatment, and warns Faith not to allow her personal life affect her patients. Connie informs Leon that Grace is only 16, to his shock. He then informs Grace that they can no longer see each other, due to her age.
1192	10	Episode 10	Julie Edwards	Philip Lawrence	6 March 2021	N/A (<4.80)
Following her agreement to provide drugs for Ross, Jan steals leftover drugs from patients that have died. Alongside Leon, she is called in to the prison to treat a patient who has been assaulted. Whilst there, she hides the drugs under a prison bed for Ross. After returning to the hospital, Ross messages her to when she can do another delivery for him. She then learns that a prisoner has been admitted to the hospital due to a drug overdose. Connie learns that Tina will be doing shifts on her ward, and she accuses Jacob of moving her onto the ward for romantic reasons. Jacob affirms that she should not be affected by his love life, and states that she dumped him due to being uninterested. Connie denies being uninterested in him, and Jacob tells her that she is emotionally unavailable, and that it is too late for them.
1193	11	Episode 11	Miranda Howard-Williams	Colin Bytheway	13 March 2021	N/A (<4.60)
Grace asks Connie what it is like to be a doctor, who explains that it consumes her life. She agrees to meet Grace for lunch, but due to work, she misses it, and later apologises. Fenisha hallucinates bad things happening to Bodhi, and asks Ethan if he can take leave so that she can return to work. Ethan affirms that he will support Fenisha, and asks her to move into his house with the baby. Faith demands to know if Lev is gay. He denies it, but feeling he has no interest in her, she tells him their marriage is over. She then goes to Dylan's house.
1194	12	Episode 12	Miranda Howard-Williams	Emma Dennis-Edwards and Stephen McAteer	27 March 2021	N/A (<4.56)
Natalia, Grace and Ollie hang out in the local area. Faith unknowingly calls Natalia, who overhears her flirting with Dylan. An upset Natalia takes drugs from a stranger. She walks out onto a train track, and when Ollie realises that there is an oncoming train, he runs in front of it and saves her. Lev arrives and takes her into hospital. Following an argument with Dylan, Faith realises that she must put her family first and walks away from her romance with Dylan. Tina works her first shift on the ED, and treats a patient whose fiancé has rapidly lost weight. Due to her experience on the oncology ward, she senses that there is an issue and asks for Connie's assistance. Connie tells her to focus on her job, but Tina's suspicions are confirmed since the man has cancer. The pair argue, since Tina does not feel that Connie is in a position of authority.
1195	13	Episode 13	Andy Newbery	Adam Hughes and Kevin Rundle	3 April 2021	4.13
While on a picnic with Grace, Ollie chokes on a sweet. She performs chest compressions on him, but feeling they are not working, she performs a tracheotomy. He is taken into hospital, where Connie lectures Grace on the decreased quality of life that she may have caused Ollie. Grace decides to move back to her father's house. When Connie learns of this, she races to the train station, where she opens up about her drug addiction and asks Grace to stay to learn Ollie's fate. The next day, David tells Connie and Grace that Ollie will be okay. Mona, the best friend of Rash's mother, is admitted into hospital following collapsing, and she is accompanied by Ashok, Rash's father. Ashok later reveals to Rash that he is in a relationship with Mona, but that he still loves and misses Madia. Jade tells Robyn that Tina seems too nice to be genuine, but is proved wrong when she makes friends with her.
1196	14	Episode 14	Andy Newbery	Ed Sellek	10 April 2021	N/A (<4.64)
Whilst with Jan, Ffion is assaulted, and the attacker secretly hands Jan a package of drugs for her next delivery to Ross. Jan leaves Ffion to recover in the hospital while she performs the delivery in prison. While planting the drugs, Iain sees her and questions what she is doing. Jan makes him promise not to say anything, and later explains the trouble that she is in. She then affirms that she will not continue to partake in the deliveries. Ollie informs David that Rosa plans on temporarily moving out to give them space during his recovery. David questions Rosa's motive for this, and he discovers that she finds it difficult to see parent him as she realises what she is missing with her dead son. David tells her that Ollie considers her a parent, and that he loves her. Lev accuses Dylan of ruining his family life, who replies that he wants no involvement with Faith nor Lev again.
1197	15	Episode 15	Nimer Rashed	Sam Holdsworth	17 April 2021	N/A (<4.64)
Marty's mother Bibi is admitted to the ED, where she reveals to him that she has had a vaginal mesh to combat her incontinence. The mesh cost Bibi £5000, which Marty vows to get back from the clinic. When Faith notices the details of a patient's mother on file, she calls her, despite the patient not wanting his mother there. Lev and Faith argue, and she outs him as gay to everybody on the ward. Faith is called in to see Jacob, who suspends her over her actions. Iain goes to see Ross in prison, where he demands that he stops using Jan to deliver drugs for him. Ross refuses, claiming there is nothing that Iain can do about it.
1198	16	Episode 16	Paul Riordan	Debbie Owen	24 April 2021	N/A (<4.13)
While out at a club with Faith, a man spikes Jade's drink. She stumbles across the club trying to alert Faith, but collapses and has her hearing aids stepped on. The man escorts a semiconscious Jade around town and throws her in a dumpster. He leans over her, but before he can do anything to her, Faith finds them and threatens him. Faith calls for an ambulance and Leon takes her into the ED. Jade vocalises her disgust with how she was targeted, explaining that it reminds her of when she was bullied for her deafness while growing up in care. Whilst on a shift together, Tina writes Jacob romantic notes, which are found by David. They have a disagreement as Jacob feels Tina does not respect his position on the ward, telling her that if she cannot treat him professionally, she should transfer to another ward. Tina apologises and the pair reconcile. Ethan continues to worry over not telling Fenisha about his Huntington's gene and decides to tell her. He informs Fenisha that Bodhi has a 50% chance of contracting the disease. Initially angry with Ethan, she assures him that they can handle it as a team. However, once he leaves, Fenisha breaks down in tears, which Ethan sees on a baby monitor.
1199	17	Episode 17	Paul Riordan	Kit Lambert	1 May 2021	N/A (<4.23)
Leon seeks Fenisha's advice when he has an interview to be a permanent paramedic at Holby. He learns that Iain is also applying for the role, who later is given the job. However, Iain recommends Leon to a friend in London to help him gain more experience, so that he can work at Holby in the future. After struggling to hear with her backup hearing aids, Jade uses an application on a tablet to understand what people are saying. After two patients are racist to staff members of colour, Jade lashes out at them and receives an informal verbal warning from Jacob. Iain visits Ross in prison, who fakes a seizure in the visiting room to get out of prison. When Ffion questions why Jan is visiting Ross in prison, Jan admits everything to her. Riddled with guilt, Jan goes to the police to confess her part in smuggling the painkillers into the prison. However, after she persuades Ross to confess, Ffion interrupts the interview. She informs both the questioning officer and Jan that Ross has offered to give the names of the gang members if he can be transferred to another prison. Jan is thankful Ffion for giving her a second chance. Jan then visits Ross and informs him that she will not be seeing him again.
1200	18	Episode 18	Katherine Churcher	Rebecca Wojciechowski	8 May 2021	N/A (<4.08)
Fenisha and Iain are called out to a motorcycling accident and are shocked to discover an injured Lev. He refuses to be treated in the hospital due to feeling embarrassed of being outed, so Fenisha treats him at the scene. However, when one of his motorcycling friends is injured, he faces the hospital to see him. Marty receives a letter from a lawyer stating that if he continues to pursue Bibi's doctor, he will be taken to court. He tells Jade, who states that they cannot keep letting men get away with mistreatment. She then opens up to Marty about being spiked. As Jade and Marty leave the hospital, a woman in a car watches them.
1201	19	Episode 19	Katherine Churcher	Kellie Smith	8 May 2021	N/A (<4.08)
Jade is horrified to learn that a woman has been admitted into the ED after being spiked. When she dies, Jade blames herself for not reporting her attack to the police. She decides to test drinks at the bar and recruits Robyn to help her. They meet a man named Avery at the bar, and when Jade decides to leave, he affirms that he will care for Robyn. Jade tests the drink he bought for Robyn, which reveals he has spiked it; she swaps the drinks while he is not looking which leads to Avery collapsing outside. They call an ambulance for him and Jade goes to the police. Marty has a meeting arranged with the clinic who performed Bibi's surgery; Ciaran arrives and reveals himself as CEO of the clinic. Ciaran claims that Bibi's condition is not affiliated with his clinic and tells Marty to stop harassing him. Marty asks Jan to go undercover as a patient seeking mesh surgery at the clinic, but she declines due to not wanting to upset Ffion with more disruption. However, when she sees Bibi's vulnerable state, she agrees to do it.
1202	20	Episode 20	Akaash Meeda	Charlie Swinbourne and Dana Fainaru	15 May 2021	N/A (<4.40)
Rash is thrown into the deep end when Ethan signs him up for the finance meeting, but he is forced to leave the meeting halfway through in order to treat his old athletics coach. Rash's coach has turned to alcoholism and blames himself for pushing the young doctor to hard which caused him to suffer an injury, although, Rash is forced to face up to his past mistakes and confirm to his coach that it was down to his partying the night before the race which caused him to become injured. In the end Rash manages to persuade his coach to get the help he needs and even races for the first time in ten years. Iain and Faith bond as they treat a dementia patient and her adoring husband, but Faith declines Ian's offer of a drink in order to focus on her kids. Tina treats a patient who reminds her of the death of her brother Nate; she later emotionally confronts Jacob over his failure to allow her to be there for her brother when he died.
1203	21	Episode 21	John Howlett	Jayshree Patel and Kellie Smith	29 May 2021	N/A (<4.00)
Marty heads to the clinic seeking revenge for his mother's poor treatment, accompanied by Jan posing as a potential patient – but he receives a distressing gets a call from Jade that changes everything – Bibi has been rushed into the ED after an overdose. While his mother is treated Ciaran attempts to offer Marty money in order for him not to report the clinic, however, Ciaran leaves in disgrace once he learns Jan has already reported him and the clinic. Tina is concerned that something is not right with Jacob, who confesses his true feelings for her after a stressful day overwhelms him.
1204	22	Episode 22	Jennie Paddon	Toby Walton	29 May 2021	N/A (<4.00)
Fenisha treats the mother of the man she left standing at the altar, and who holds her responsible for the death of her husband. Fenisha's difficult situation is made even more complicated when her former fiance Matthew starts working at Holby as a locum registrar. Ethan persuades Fenisha to talk to Matthew and the pair reconcile. Rash puts his medical training to the test when Ollie is brought in by David and Rosa. The doctor learns that Rosa's deceased son had similar symptoms to Ollie. Marty channels his anger into a good cause after his mother's suicide attempt and announces that the hospital will be offering support on vaginal meshes in the future.
1205	23	Episode 23	Jennie Paddon	Katie Douglas	5 June 2021	N/A (<3.58)
Lev enjoys a weekend with new boyfriend Xander, however, closes up when confronted in public with a homophobic man. Having brought the man in as a patient Lev eventually loses his temper and punches the man in front of Xander, who decides to dump him after the altercation. At the ambulance station, Lev refuses to admit what really happened between himself and the patient and is arrested. Ethan is forced to consider his future when he loses control of his hand in theatre as a result of his huntington's condition. Charlie receives an unexpected guest who claims to know him.
1206	24	Episode 24	Piotr Szkopiak	Joanna Quesnel	5 June 2021	N/A (<3.58)
Jacob admits that he does not feel ready to move in with Tina, so she responds to the rejection by flirting with Matthew in front of him in an attempt to make him jealous. Once this fails Tina provokes a patient in to attacking her and is pleased when she is able to manipulate Jacob in to agreeing to allow her to move in. Lev is facing an assault charge and hiding out at a hotel to avoid telling the kids the truth about himself. Faith turns to Xander for help in reaching out to him, although, Xander confirms that he can not put his life on hold for Lev and leaves him. Robyn is startled to find her old school friend Paul has started as the new receptionist temp in the ED.
1207	25	Episode 25	Piotr Szkopiak	Jess Green and Kit Lambert	12 June 2021	N/A (<3.75)
Ollie is readmitted into the hospital and Rash attempts to find the cause of his illness. Rosa arrives late, claiming she had her phone turned off due to attending a training course. Rash believes Ollie has food poisoning and tells Rosa and David to not allow him to eat or drink. Rosa allows him outside with a hot chocolate and when Rash finds them, Ollie vomits and collapses. Rash asks David if he believes Rosa has any involvement in Ollie's condition, and when Ollie tells David that she has been obsessive lately, he becomes suspicious of her. He finds pills in her bag and learns that she was not attending a training course and questions her; she reveals that she was seeing a doctor and that the pills are antidepressants. David then asks how her dead son Gabriel died, to which she does not answer. Fenisha leaves Bodhi with Ethan to attend a callout, and while he is caring for the baby, Fenisha notices his arm twitch, which she accredits to his Huntington's.
1208	26	Episode 26	John Maidens	Stephen McAteer	10 July 2021	3.46
Lev meets with the man who punched him and offers him money to drop the assault charges against him, but he asks for more. Sam is then hit by a car and Lev treats him. At the hospital, Faith urges Lev to inform the police that he is gay in order for them to realise it was a homophobic hate crime. He continues to deny being gay but with Faith's support, he tearfully comes out as gay. When the pair return home, they find Lev's father Anton. Lev pleas Faith not to say anything about his sexuality to him. Vanessa, the former CEO of the hospital, is admitted into the ED. Tina believes that Vanessa is being abused by her husband and explains that she was once abused by a partner to coax her into explaining the situation. She denies being abused and Rash later realises that she is the abuser in the relationship. After the case is dealt with, Rash praises Tina for sharing her story of abuse, but she reveals that she lied to move Vanessa, which he feels uncomfortable with. Charlie learns that someone is catfishing women on a dating app by using his identity. Tina dissuades him from going to the police, claiming that nothing illegal has happened.
1209	27	Episode 27	Michael Lacey	Hilary Frankland	17 July 2021	3.42
Matthew overhears Fenisha and Ethan discussing their romantic feelings for each other. She then dumps Matthew, who is disgusted by her treatment of him. He confronts Ethan, who tells Fenisha that she needs to take Matthew back. Fenisha professes that she wants to be with Ethan, but he claims he does not want her to become his carer when he begins dying. Fenisha says that she wants to be with him regardless of his condition worsening and proposes to him, to which he accepts. David vents to Dylan about his beliefs that Rosa is poisoning Ollie. Jacob interviews Rosa about her involvement with Ollie and she faints midway through. Jacob examines Rosa's symptoms and reveals she has the menopause. David finds texts on Ollie's phone asking him to meet; he initially suspects it is Rosa, but calls the number and is shocked when a different woman answers. He apologises to Rosa and asks her to come back home, and despite accepting, she gives him a frosty reception.
1210	28	Episode 28	Michael Lacey	Dana Fainaru	24 July 2021	3.82
Throughout numerous interactions with Tina, Jacob makes the mental decision between either keeping the peace or speaking up about her treatment of him. When performing surgery on a patient, Tina urges Jacob to allow her to perform it. He goes with the judgement of not allowing her since she is a junior staff member; Tina reacts by shouting at Jacob and throwing a glass award at Jacob, cutting his hand.
1211	29	Episode 29	Matt Hilton	Kevin Rundle	31 July 2021	3.96
On his wedding day, Ethan waits to receive test results about his Huntington's. After suffering from a seizure, Ollie is brought into the ED. Dylan suspects that Ollie is self-harming and suggests a mental health assessment, but David is adamant that he is not self-harming. After having an MRI scan, Ollie is revealed to have a Chiari 1 malformation. However, Dylan still suggests a mental health assessment, but David believes surgery will absolve Ollie's issues. When Anton sees Luka playing in a dress, he lectured him on masculinity. Lev snaps at his father and comes out as gay to him. Anton brands him a pervert, but Lev is unbothered by his father's opinions since he comes to the conclusion that he will report his hate crime to the police. He meets with Xander to tell the police, but sees Matthew and Fenisha on a train track. He runs over to help them whilst a train approaches the three of them.
1212	30	Episode 30	Matt Hilton	Ed Sellek	7 August 2021	4.31
Matthew, Fenisha and Lev manage to free themselves from the car before an oncoming train hits them. However, just as he swerves that train, Lev is struck by another train. Ethan arrives at the scene, having just received positive results about his Huntington's, and treats Lev, unaware Fenisha is injured. Once back at the hospital, Ethan spends time trying to revive Lev, while other doctors try to revive and save Fenisha. Seconds after Lev is pronounced dead, Ethan is informed that Fenisha is in the hospital room; he realises that he could have been with her in her final moments and tells the team to stop pursuing her, since she is dead.
