= Casualty series 36 =

Thirty-sixth series of Casualty

Casualty
- Series 36
- Starring: William Beck; Di Botcher; Milo Clarke; Jason Durr; Amanda Henderson; Adele James; Shalisha James-Davis; Shaheen Jafargholi; Elinor Lawless; Gabriella Leon; Kirsty Mitchell; Neet Mohan; Osi Okerafor; George Rainsford; Jacey Sallés; Arin Smethurst; Michael Stevenson; Derek Thompson; Charles Venn
- No. of episodes: 44

Release
- Original network: BBC One; BBC One HD
- Original release: 14 August 2021 – 13 August 2022

Series chronology
- ← Previous; Series 35 Next → Series 37

The thirty-sixth series of the British medical drama television series Casualty commenced airing in the United Kingdom on BBC One on 14 August 2021, a week after the conclusion of the previous series and finished on 13 August 2022. The series focuses on the professional and personal lives of medical and ancillary staff at the emergency department (ED) of the fictional Holby City Hospital. Loretta Preece continues her role as series producer and Deborah Sathe is the senior executive producer. It also marked the return of episode titles after a four-year absence.

== Production ==
The series commences in the United Kingdom on 14 August 2021 on BBC One and airs on Saturday nights. It was produced by BBC Studios. Loretta Preece continues her role as series producer, while Deborah Sathe acts as the senior executive producer. On 12 November 2021, it was announced that former story producer Jon Sen would become the show's executive producer from the following month. His first episode aired on 11 June 2022. New filming techniques implemented during the previous series, as a result of the COVID-19 pandemic, meant that episode runtimes for the series were shortened from the usual 50 minutes to 40 minutes. Notable exceptions to the usual run-time are the opening episode which runs for 71 minutes., episode 39 which runs for 80 minutes and episode 43 which lasts 75 minutes.

=== Promotion ===
The series was promoted through multiple trailers and each episode received a preview clip before broadcast. A trailer was released on 15 July 2021 to promote Richard Winsor's return as Caleb Knight as part of the opening episode. On 2 August 2021, another trailer was released previewing the opening episode. Rhys Freeman from Planet Radio dubbed it "dramatic". A further trailer teasing more storylines during the series was released on 8 August 2021. The Metro's Duncan Lindsay thought the trailer was "explosive" and opined, "Relentless as ever, never take your eyes off Casualty!"

=== Filming ===
The production protocols introduced at the beginning of production of the previous series were continued into series 36. These protocols ensured the safety of those working on the serial and included adhering to the physical distancing measures enforced by the British government. The measures require cast and crew to maintain a two-metre distance at all times. Preece told Sophie Dainty of Digital Spy that this was challenging as the show works on "close contact medicine, stunts and emotional exchanges", which was hard to film while adhering to physical distancing measures. To maintain distancing in scenes with multiple characters, plate shots were filmed. Each shot includes different actors, stood distanced, and in post-production, the shots were edited together to make it appear like one shot. Green screens were also used to make actors appear closer together than they were allowed to be. Producer Mat McHale confirmed that the difference would not be noticeable on-screen. Preece reiterated this and promised that the show had not "compromised" on its quality as a result of changes to filming.

During production, producers faced a challenge of face masks, which are compulsory in hospitals. Preece believed that after much exploration, these masks limited the emotion of scenes, so they were not worn all the time. Since the drama is set in a hospital, characters used personal protective equipment (PPE) as part of their costume. To avoid using NHS resources, Casualty sourced their PPE from an alternative supplier and despite this, it maintains effectiveness, allowing them to occasionally breach the physical distancing measures. Due to the protocols enforced, cast were required to apply their own makeup with verbal support from the makeup artists. The show regularly uses makeup-created injuries, such as cuts and bruises, but this was stopped due to the new protection measures. Additionally, to film kissing scenes, the show hired the partners of the actors to be body doubles. Due to their integral nature within the show's format, the use of stunts were not stopped; instead, additional work went to making the stunts safe to film. Oates and Preece agreed that often, stunts were easier to arrange than swapping props, due to the time and money involved in them.

=== Writing ===
In September 2021, the serial, in collaboration with BBC Writersroom, launched a writing scheme asking frontline medical workers to create part of a script focusing on a consultant's "day from hell in the ED". Show bosses developed the scheme as part of a new innovative to maintain the accuracy of the show's storylines. Applications opened on 6 September and close on 20 October. Sathe expressed her excitement at the scheme and thought it gave medics the opportunity to see the television industry after Casualty has spent years inspiring viewers to join the medical industry. Jessica Loveland, the head of new writing at BBC Writersroom, expressed her delight at working with the drama and hoped to build on the "tradition of medical professionals translating their skills and understanding of human psychology into creative writing and storytelling".

Three medics-turned-writers were selected from the entries as winners of the competition: Samantha Bacchus, and writing duo Laura Griffiths and Chris Griffiths. Their win was announced on 14 April 2022. The writers join the show's shadow script team and will work on the special episode as well as developing future stories. Bacchus worked as a nurse on the front line of the NHS for over 15 years before becoming a full time novelist. She credits the drama with inspiring to enter nursing. Laura Griffiths has over 33 years experience in the NHS, while Chris Griffiths has experience as a paramedic and within trauma teams. Sarah Beeson, the show's script producer, praised the trio for their "authentic creative ambition and clear passion for Casualty". Bacchus, Griffiths and Griffiths all expressed their joy at working with the show's writing team on an episode.

=== Storyline development ===
Casualty celebrates thirty-five years since its first episode on 6 September 2021 and producers marked the milestone with a feature-length opening episode. The episode is set a month after the conclusion of the previous series; the aftermath of the deaths of Fenisha Khatri (Olivia D'Lima) and Lev Malinovsky (Uriel Emil) is the focus point in the first half of the episode. The episode also contains scenes set in 2016, exploring a day in the ED which has dramatic consequences for the characters. For the episode, three former cast members – Richard Winsor, Tony Marshall (Noel Garcia) and Charles Dale (Big Mac) – reprised their roles as they were in the cast at the time. Preece expressed her excitement about the anniversary celebrations and described it as a "smorgasbord to offer both new and old fans of Casualty".

A press release for the series confirmed that Ethan Hardy (George Rainsford) and Jacob Masters (Charles Venn) would feature in stories which Preece dubbed "huge [and] heart-breaking". Rainsford said that filming this series was his "busiest time on the show" and teased "some big, juicy episodes". Ethan's story begins in the opening episode, following the death of Fenisha, who was his fiancée. It continues the exploration of his Huntington's disease diagnosis and how he copes as a newly-single father. Jacob's story is long-running and explores the topic of coercive control as he is abused by his partner, Tina Mollett (Adele James). The plot was heavily researched by production staff and the cast. Venn wanted to highlight the issue and that it is not "gender-specific". He praised the show for "tackling such a deeply-rooted issue" through his character, who he did not deem "aesthetically" vulnerable.

The death of Lev in the previous series also generated a new story for his estranged wife, Faith Cadogan (Kirsty Mitchell), who works to support their three young children. Jade Lovall's (Gabriella Leon) backstory is also explored, beginning with her reasoning for joining nursing in the opening episode. Writers created a new story for Jan Jenning (Di Botcher) and her wife, Ffion Morgan (Stirling Gallacher), as part of the series. On the story, Preece commented, "Their marriage is certainly pushed to its limits." In July 2021, Preece confirmed that the series would feature a two-part Christmas special, written by Barbara Machin, who she called "one of television's most prestigious writers".

== Cast ==
The thirty-sixth series of Casualty features a cast of characters working for the NHS within the emergency department of Holby City Hospital and the Holby Ambulance Service. Most cast members from the previous series reprise their roles in this series. William Beck appears as Dylan Keogh, a consultant in emergency medicine, while Di Botcher portrays Jan Jenning, the operational duty manager at Holby Ambulance Service. Jason Durr features as David Hide, a senior staff nurse, and Amanda Henderson appears as staff nurse Robyn Miller. Shaheen Jafargholi, Adele James and Gabriella Leon reprise their respective roles as staff nurses Marty Kirkby, Christina "Tina" Mollett, and Jade Lovall. Kirsty Mitchell stars as Faith Cadogan, an advanced clinical practitioner (ACP), and Neet Mohan appears as Rash Masum, a F1 doctor. Oli Okerafor portrays locum registrar Matthew Afolami, and George Rainsford plays consultant Ethan Hardy. Jacey Sallés stars as Rosa Cadenas, a healthcare assistant, and Michael Stevenson reprises his role as Iain Dean, a paramedic. Original cast member Derek Thompson appears as Charlie Fairhead, a senior charge nurse and emergency nurse practitioner. Charles Venn stars as Jacob Masters, the department's clinical nurse manager. Additionally, Stirling Gallacher appears in a recurring capacity as Ffion Morgan, a police officer.

Leon became the first cast member to leave the show during series 36. Her character Jade departs in episode five after deciding to quit nursing. James departed her role as Tina at the conclusion of her storyline. She made her final appearance in episode seven.

The opening episode of the series features appearances from former characters Cal Knight (Winsor), Noel Garcia (Marshall) and Mackenzie "Big Mac" Chalker (Dale). Their returns were announced on 14 July 2021. Winsor and Dale last appeared in series 31, while Marshall departed in the previous series. Both Cal and Noel were killed off as part of their original departures. Marshall expressed his excitement at reprising the role and "[tackling] yet another important subject". Dale stated that he was pleased to work with his co-stars again, and Winsor teased that his character would be "haunting Ethans [sic] dreams and flashing back in time". Cal also appears in the second episode. Suzanne Packer reprised her role as nurse Tess Bateman in the series. The actress revealed her return in November 2021, and the character returns for episodes 14 and 15.

On 20 May 2021, it was announced that Elinor Lawless had been cast as Stevie Nash, an ED consultant. Lawless described her character as "a force to be reckoned with", while Preece called her "charismatic, contemporary, compelling and on occasion very unsettling". She added that Stevie would introduce "a new and dangerous energy into our world", creating "a new and exciting era for Casualty". The character debuts in the first episode. Milo Clarke's casting in the role of Theodore "Teddy" Gowan, a new paramedic, was announced on 10 August 2021. He is billed as Jan's excitable and enthusiastic nephew who has a dislike for Charlie. Clarke expressed his excitement at joining the cast and representing the NHS. He commented, "I hope his charm and zest are qualities viewers can enjoy." Sah Brockner, portrayed by Arin Smethurst, was introduced in episode seven. Smethurst billed their character as a "salty but fiercely compassionate" paramedic. Sah is the first non-binary regular character to appear in Casualty and Smethurst hoped that the representation would provide "a source of awareness for those who have never met someone like [them]".

The series features several recurring characters and multiple guest stars. The opening episode features Marshall's son in the guest role of Rudi, a patient in the ED. Episode one also features appearances from Lollie McKenzie and Paul Popplewell who reprise their respective roles as Natalia Malinovsky, Lev and Faith's daughter, and Paul Pegg, Robyn's love interest, from the previous series. Popplewell also appears in episode ten. However, when the character of Natalia returned towards the end of the season on a recurring basis, she had been recast with Zoe Brough. Sophie Stone reprised her role as Susie Ashby, the biological mother of Jade, in episode five as part of Jade's departure storyline. As part of Rash's new story exploring gang violence, Zainab Hasan joined the guest cast in episode six as Hafsa Kazimi, a gang leader who shares a backstory with Rash. She appears in three episodes, concluding with her death in episode 13. Kriss Dosanjh reprised his guest role as Ashok Masum, Rash's father, in episodes 11 and 13 as part of the story. Comedian Rosie Jones reprised her role as patient Paula Kettering in episode 13. Jones was excited to play Paula again and explore an important story. Dainty (Digital Spy) confirmed in December 2021 that Jones would appear again during the following month. Raj Bajaj joined the recurring cast as social worker Adi Kapadia in episode 13. He features in Paula's story and acts as a love interest for Marty. Harry Collett, who has played David's son Ollie since series 28, returned for a stint of four episodes beginning in episode thirty-three and making his final appearance in episode thirty-nine at the conclusion of a school shooting storyline.

=== Main characters ===
- William Beck as Dylan Keogh
- Di Botcher as Jan Jenning
- Milo Clarke as Theodore "Teddy" Gowan (from episode 1)
- Jason Durr as David Hide
- Amanda Henderson as Robyn Miller
- Shaheen Jafargholi as Marty Kirkby
- Adele James as Christina "Tina" Mollett (until episode 7)
- Shalisha James-Davis as Paige Allcott (from episode 16)
- Elinor Lawless as Stevie Nash (from episode 1)
- Gabriella Leon as Jade Lovall (until episode 5)
- Kirsty Mitchell as Faith Cadogan
- Neet Mohan as Rash Masum
- Osi Okerafor as Matthew Afolami (until episode 32)
- George Rainsford as Ethan Hardy
- Jacey Sallés as Rosa Cadenas (until episode 27)
- Arin Smethurst as Sah Brockner (from episode 7)
- Michael Stevenson as Iain Dean
- Derek Thompson as Charlie Fairhead
- Charles Venn as Jacob Masters

=== Recurring characters ===
- Raj Bajaj as Adi Kapadia (episodes 13–43)
- Jaimi Barbakoff as Emma Nash (episodes 1–11)
- Zoe Brough as Natalia Malinovsky (episodes 37–42)
- Lauren Crace as Chrissie Danes (episodes 14–29)
- Maxine Evans as Gaynor Gowan (episodes 24–31)
- Stirling Gallacher as Ffion Morgan (episodes 3–43)
- Richard Harrington as Jonty Buchanan (episodes 40–43)
- Rosie Jones as Paula Kettering (episodes 13–30)
- Simone Saunders as Holly Cage (episodes 9–31)
- Narinder Simra as Pen Khatri (episodes 2–18)
- Adam Sina as Marcus Fidel (episodes 1, 41 and 43)
- Maya Soroya as Jessica Holten (episodes 27–38)
- Noah Valentine as Rob Tranter (episodes 35–39)

=== Guest characters ===
- Holly Aird as Laura Merriman (episodes 14–15)
- Jack Ashton as Emma Knockton (episode 18)
- Adam Aziz as Rayan Ayad (episodes 8 and 13)
- Jennifer Brown as Louise Prierton (episodes 33 and 39)
- Alex Childs as Jools Bockner (episodes 41 and 44)
- Harry Collett as Oliver Hide (episodes 33–39)
- Maeve Courtier-Lilley as Veronica Fairwell (episodes 24 and 27)
- Charles Dale as Mackenzie "Big Mac" Chalker (episode 1)
- Kriss Dosanjh as Ashok Masum (episodes 11 and 13)
- Alison Dowling as Ashley Khatri (episodes 2 and 18)
- Zainab Hasan as Hafsa Kazimi (episodes 6–13)
- Aurora Jones as Charlotte Miller (episodes 21 and 24)
- Jackie Knowles as Rosalene Hide (episode 39)
- Olivia D'Lima as Fenisha Khatri (episode 34)
- Tony Marshall as Noel Garcia (episode 1)
- Lollie McKenzie as Natalia Malinovsky (episode 1)
- Tom Mulheron as Luka Malinovsky (episode 22)
- Suzanne Packer as Tess Bateman (episodes 14–15)
- Gordon Peaston as Kevin Brockner (episodes 35 and 44)
- Paul Popplewell as Paul Pegg (episodes 1–43)
- Steve Raine as Al Shipton (episodes 4 and 31)
- Sophie Stone as Susan Ashby (episode 5)
- Nathan Sussex as Pat Harner (episodes 29 and 33)
- Maanuv Thiara as Chauncey Myer (episodes 11 and 13)
- Alex Walkinshaw as Adrian "Fletch" Fletcher (episode 29)
- Richard Winsor as Caleb "Cal" Knight (episodes 1–2)

== Episodes ==
No. overall	No. in series	Title	Directed by	Written by	Original release date	UK viewers (millions)
1213	1	"Begin Again"	Piotr Szkopiak	Hilary Frankland and Ed Sellek	14 August 2021	3.98
A young woman with hypermobility dislocates a shoulder when her van is involved in a near collision. She admits to new consultant Stevie Nash, an old friend of Faith's, that she broke her father, who has early onset dementia, out of a care home for his birthday and he is in the back of the van. Stevie and Faith find him at a fairground with a cut head and his daughter is forced to accept her brother was right to place him in care. New paramedic Teddy Gowan reveals his mother was a victim of Charlie's catfish and they set a trap. Robyn admits that she set up Charlie's profile to show he could get dates but, unknown to her, Paul used it to ask women for money. Charlie brings Ethan in with a favour. It is revealed in flashbacks to five years earlier that Stevie told her sister Emma she had slept with her fiance Marcus. Emma drove off in a huff. Jade distracted her boyfriend while he was driving, causing him to crash into Emma's car, and she stemmed the bleeding until Iain arrived. Ethan made a mistake intubating her, leaving her without oxygen for a prolonged period, and Cal covered for him. At the same time, Dylan treated a man injured in a fire at a caravan and Noel worked out from a drawing by the man's son that he had been stabbed prior to the fire and had internal bleeding. In the present day, Ethan fails to recognise Stevie and is unaware Emma has been in a vegetative state in a hospice ever since.
1214	2	"Same Old, Same Old"	Judith Dine	Toby Walton	21 August 2021	3.83
Set over a five day period. Jacob, who is arguing with Tina, saves a woman from drowning herself while out jogging. She makes another attempt two days later after the mental health care team were unable to find her a place in hospital locally. Jacob tries to get her to accept help but she slips away when the mental health nurse is distracted and is implied to drown herself. Tina beats Jacob after seeing him chatting to a flirtatious patient but he later proposes to her. Teddy finds Jan is sleeping in the ambulance station and she admits she and Ffion have split up. Ethan is hallucinating Cal and struggling to look after Bodhi. He tries to treat a man with a nose bleed and is frustrated that he is more interested in the woman Matthew is treating who fainted, eventually realising they are having an affair. He clashes with Matthew and ends up leaving Bodhi outside Ash and Pen's house with a note.
1215	3	"Short Fuses"	Judith Dine	Rachel Harper	28 August 2021	3.19
A pregnant woman discovers her boyfriend has constructed a gender reveal cannon, only for it to explode when she lights it. Her boyfriend has an asthma attack after accompanying her to hospital and admits he is worried about being a father but the pair talk through their worries. Robyn and Rosa tell them they're having a boy. Ethan meets with Pen to hand over Bodhi's things and clashes with Matthew, who believes Fenisha would have wanted Ethan and Bodhi to stay together. Ffion injures her foot chasing a suspect and tests show she might have breast cancer. Jan, who has been staying with Iain, offers to move back in but Ffion is not ready to forgive her.
1216	4	"No Harm Done"	George C Siougas	Hilary Frankland	4 September 2021	3.29
Jacob and Tina argue over the wedding date and she throws a stapler at him. Iain answers a call to their home where Tina has stabbed Jacob with a broken bottle. He takes Jacob to St James' and warns Tina to get out of the house. Iain and Teddy meet Al, who has been sleeping in a tent in the park since being accused of abuse years earlier and is constantly harassed. A woman insists her boyfriend accompany her to the dry cleaner's and a van crashes into the parked car with him inside. He is rushed to Resus where Jade volunteers to help Stevie treat him. The girlfriend checks his phone and confronts a female colleague about messages they exchanged but the colleague gives an innocent explanation for them. The girlfriend admits she is paranoid after an ex cheated on her for years. Unaware of the connection, Jade tells Stevie about saving Emma's life but also that she caused the accident in the first place.
1217	5	"The Road Less Travelled"	George C Siougas	Katie Douglas	18 September 2021	3.95
A minibus carrying a group of deaf people on an outing crashes. Jade discovers her estranged mother Susie among the minor injuries and talks to her about growing up in foster homes. The van driver has metal impaling her abdomen and pulls it out rather than have to go to theatre. Ethan learns she has a brain tumour and wants to die at home but the tumour is now leaking. Stevie treats a jogger with an ankle injury. She suspects the woman has osteoporosis but the patient refuses to stay for a diagnosis since jogging is her only way of coping with her grief since her husband died. Dylan finds drugs in Jade's locker, implied to have been planted by Stevie. Jacob has shut himself away at home to hide his injuries and Charlie tells Jade she will have to be suspended. Instead, she resigns, deciding she wants to work with foster children.
1218	6	"Warning Signs"	Michael Lacey	David Bowker	2 October 2021	3.47
Matthew sees an injured girl, Farrah, be chased and then taken away in a car. She is later brought into hospital by Hafsa, the sister of an old friend of Rash's, who tells him her brother got involved with a gang and died of an overdose. Although Hafsa claims to know Farrah through a mentoring scheme, Rash realises she was injured in gang violence but disposes of her knife and covers for her. A father takes his teenage son hunting. A woman threatens to report them and the son accidentally shoots her with a crossbow. The father, who is on a suspended sentence, leaves his son to call the ambulance and later tries to take him from the hospital but the boy suffers a panic attack and Charlie convinces his father to support him. The woman, who is estranged from her own son, says she can't remember what happened. Matthew and Stevie sleep together.
1219	7	"Broken"	Michael Lacey	Joanna Quesnel	9 October 2021	3.93
Jacob takes Tina off the rota and tells the staff they've broken up but she gets a shift in the ED as an agency nurse. Teddy and new non-binary paramedic Sah Brockner find a teenaged girl injured after a fall from a roof. The girl gives a false name which is discovered when she turns out to be diabetic: She is a traveller, Ren, who has been looked after by her grandfather, Don, since her mother died of diabetic complications and her father left, and fell out with him after stealing her grandmother's jewellery. Upset at Ren flirting with Jacob, Tina kidnaps her and locks them both in an ambulance while Ren is in a diabetic crisis, then claims to be pregnant and threatens to commit suicide by giving herself an embolism. Jacob and Iain talk her into releasing Ren and she admits she isn't pregnant before being arrested. Jacob is upset that his private life is now common knowledge.
1220	8	"Is the Patient Breathing?"	John Howlett	Simon Norman and Hilary Frankland	23 October 2021	4.02
Teddy asks to be partnered with Jan for the day. Their first shout seems them treat a drug addict who has overdosed, with Teddy chasing him after he steals his phone and narrowly avoiding a needle-stick injury. Iain and Sah are assigned an elderly man who fell out of bed and broke his hip but are twice redirected, first to a teenage girl who complained of chest pains but seems more interested in updating her social media, then to a man who attempted suicide after his wife died and was found by a friend. When they finally get the elderly man to hospital, Dylan and Matthew conclude he has had a heart attack and is in kidney failure and wouldn't survive surgery. Jan and Teddy are called out to a woman with learning difficulties who lives at a remote property: It transpires a friend of hers has set up a cannabis farm on the property and she wants rid of him. The friend knocks out Teddy and tries to drive off with him but Jan forces him to flee on foot, after which she and Teddy learn they have both accidentally been eating hash brownies.
1221	9 (Note: "Two Tribes" was set to air on 16 October 2021 as episode 8 but was pulled from the schedule due to the death of David Amess. It was later aired as episode 9 on 30 October 2021.)	"Two Tribes"	John Howlett	Stephen McAteer	30 October 2021	3.77
Hafsa brings a teen, Rayan, to stay with Rash. A gang leader, Tyson, tells one of his gang, Kyle, to stab a member of a rival gang as retaliation. Kyle stabs Rayan in the back, not realising until later that he's his former foster brother. Kyle met Charlie years earlier when his foster mother, an anti-gang campaigner, was stabbed. He arranges for the police to catch Tyson threatening him with a knife, leading to his arrest. Rayan tells Rash that Hafsa recruits teens for county lines drug trafficking, but she insists she's trying to get them out. Dylan is hoping to give up being acting clinical lead but board member Holly asks him to take on the job permanently, although they have another candidate line-up. Dylan covers for Ethan when he has a tremor in Resus and learns he stopped taking his medication when Fenisha died. He realises Stevie is the other candidate and she has a grudge against Ethan so accepts the role.
1222	10	"Blinded"	Conor Morrissey	Jenny Davis	6 November 2021	3.52
Paul returns to work and clears the air with Charlie, although Robyn has a hard time trusting him again. They are both injured when Jacob freezes up while treating a thief who has an angry outburst, and Jacob decides to step down as clinical nurse manager. Two police officers come across a break-in and find a black youth bent over an unconscious elderly woman. The younger officer chases him into the garden and tasers him, claiming he threatened him with a kitchen knife. At hospital, the youth reveals he and the old lady are friends and he broke in to help after she suffered a stroke. Stevie misses a head injury and he dies in Resus. The older policeman finds evidence his colleague planted the knife and reports him to Internal Affairs. Ethan fails to pass on a message to Stevie from the hospice, and by the time Paul tells her about it, Emma has died.
1223	11	"Two Minutes"	George C Siougas	Dan Berlinka	6 November 2021	3.48
Rash is approached by gang leader Chauncey, who threatens to report the fact he treated one of his gang off the books the previous night unless Rash gets him drugs. Gang members also threaten Ashok. Instead, Rash calls the police. Two sisters, Maja and Elike, fall into barbed wire after being caught graffitiing their old employer. Elike is haemophiliac and Stevie wants to remove the barbed wire from Maja in order to treat her. Dylan and Ethan overrule her but Maja pulls it out anyway: She feels she owes Elike because she accepted an out of court settlement when they sued for wrongful dismissal. Stevie treats Luke, the patient who previously attacked Robyn, and talks of a bad doctor hurting her. She wants him assessed by mental health but Ethan discharges him. Stevie confronts Ethan on the roof with a pair of scissors and reminds him who she is; he tells her about his Huntington's. Luke stabs Ethan with the scissors and Stevie saves his life by stemming the bleeding until help arrives.
1224	12	"Gasping for Air"	Piotr Szkopiak	Stephen McAteer	20 November 2021	3.45
A man, Dave, drives into a secure housing area with a gun. Ffion and her colleague Mike investigate, followed by Jan and Sah. Dave accidentally shoots Mike with what was meant to be a warning shot before wounding Ffion. He holds Tony, the head of a diesel company, at gunpoint in front of Jan and Ffion; Dave was his lawyer and covered up harmful emissions. Dave is now dying of lung cancer, probably from smoking, and blames Tony for the death of his son from a severe asthma attack. He tries to get Tony to confess on a live stream but Dave is accidentally shot during a struggle and dies in the ambulance. Mike recovers and Tony releases a statement confessing. Jan and Ffion reconcile. Stevie visits a recovering Ethan and they agree to put things behind them, although things remain frosty.
1225	13	"Retribution"	Piotr Szkopiak	Dana Fainaru	27 November 2021	N/A (<4.44) (Note: Not reported in the weekly top 15 programmes for four-screen viewer ratings.)
Rash is abducted by Chauncey and taken to a barn to treat Hafsa, who has been stabbed. Chauncey accuses Rayan of betraying them but Rash tells him he went to the police. Hafsa dies since Rash doesn't have the right equipment, after telling him to let her family know. Ashok alerts Matthew and reveals he is tracking Rash's phone. The police arrive and arrest Chauncey. Dylan treats Paula Kettering for an ankle injury and learns she is seven months pregnant. He alerts social services but social worker Adi reveals Paula had a baby taken into care because of neglect and a violent partner and says the situation will be monitored. Dylan advises David to apply for clinical nurse manager.
1226	14	"Remember Me, Part One"	Matt Hilton	Barbara Machin	4 December 2021	N/A (<4.34)
Christmas 2020: Laura Merriman is released from prison 14 years after causing trouble at the ED and goes looking for her daughter Rosie, who is now working there as an HCA. Tess is doing an agency shift at the hospital and learns Charlie is having brain scans. Adi arrives with Emina, an asylum seeker with Covid, and her son Lorik: She is in a safe house after leaving her abusive partner Jed but left her other son Kazmir with him. Jed tries to flee with Kazmir in a van but drives off a cliff onto a ledge. Iain and his HEMS partner and girlfriend Chrissie arrive and Iain gets into the van to help. Jed causes the van to fall off the ledge but all three seem unharmed. However, Iain later collapses outside the hospital. Laura goes to the hospital under a false name and finds Rosie is pregnant, trying to convince Marty and Adi she might hurt herself. Laura confronts Rosie on a stairwell, learning she is estranged from her father and foster parent and the baby's father isn't around, and ends up pushing her down it.
1227	15	"Remember Me, Part Two"	Matt Hilton	Barbara Machin	11 December 2021	3.40
Iain is rushed into Resus and found to have internal bleeding. He later recovers and is reunited with Chrissie. Charlie and Ethan work out that Kazmir is Lorrik's brother and Charlie convinces him to stay with his family rather than leaving with Jed, who is left with the police to be questioned about abuse. Charlie finds he has a berry aneurysm. Rosie has an emergency caesarean and Laura tries to take custody of the baby while she's unconscious but Adi refuses without an assessment. Charlie and Tess finally realise who Laura is but she disappears with the baby after Marty distracts Adi. She is tracked down after starting a fire in a store room smoking and threatens the baby with a scalpel. Tess gets the baby to safety and Laura walks into the flames.
1228	16	"Handcuffs"	Eric Styles	Katie Douglas	8 January 2022	N/A (<4.72)
Stevie takes Faith out to a bar, where a waitress, Paige, handcuffs herself to Heath, a young man she saw stealing, only for them to both fall from a balcony when he has a fit. They have to be taken to hospital together while Stevie and Faith treat minor injuries. Stevie encourages Faith to move on from Levi and she goes home with a man, James. Rash tries to talk Ethan into seeing Bodhi again. Heath tries to get Paige to run away with him and she admits she is an F1 due to start at the department next week. She suspects Heath has a brain tumour and tells him and his estranged mother without evidence. Dylan quickly refutes this, saying he most likely has epilepsy. He talks Paige through treating Heath when he has another seizure while they're locked in a toilet together but tells her she needs to do better.
1229	17	"She's My Baby"	Eric Styles	Lydia Marchant	15 January 2022	N/A (<4.35)
Paula falls from a balcony when a railing gives way while she is arguing with some boys. The boys claim she jumped and Dylan reports to social services that she may have tried to kill herself before realising his mistake. Dylan defends Paula at a social services hearing but Adi reports the baby will be taken into care at birth, which seemingly prompts Paula to run away. Paige has her first shift, partnered with Stevie. They meet an older pregnant woman who collapsed during an exercise class. It transpires she is acting as a surrogate for her daughter, who was born without a womb. She has gestational osteoperosis and will need a caesarean to avoid injury during the birth but Paige misses the fact she is in labour and they have to do a vaginal delivery. The daughter is scared of having to look after the baby herself while her mother has surgery but Paige convinces her she can cope.
1230	18	"Close Encounters"	Thomas Hescott	Hamish Wright	22 January 2022	N/A (<4.02)
A 10-year-old boy and his teenaged older brother are UFO spotting on a hill. The younger boy apparently sees lights just before falling down the hillside, injuring them both. He is convinced aliens took his father and is trying to stop his brother going to college. Rash discovers he has a brain tumour which could have caused him to hallucinate and his mother convinces him to let his brother go. Ethan finds Matthew treating Bodhi for a fever. He argues with Pen and Ashley about taking Bodhi back, eventually suggesting shared custody. Faith admits to Stevie she only had coffee with James and takes another man, Angus, back to her house. He becomes intense when she changes her mind and asks him to leave, so Faith sends an emergency text to Stevie. Angus causes Stevie to fall and hit her head. Despite this, Faith meets up with him again and sleeps with him, only for him to rob her while she's asleep.
1231	19	"Delayed Reaction"	Thomas Hescott	Ed Sellek and Jason Sutton	29 January 2022	N/A (<4.30)
Faith discovers the robbery and admits what happened to Stevie. They treat a couple who were left joined together after she spasmed during sex. Faith accuses the man of sexually assaulting the woman and is threatened with a complaint: It was actually the first time they'd had sex since she miscarried. Faith gets into a public argument with Stevie after thinking she told Dylan about Angus. Iain finds himself partnered with ex-girlfriend Chrissie, who has taken extra shifts at the ambulance station. They are called in after a man who has provided his wife with heroin causes an explosion while making bullets in their garage: They are both ex-services and she is self-medicating for PTSD, with him making the bullets to pay for the drugs. It eventually transpires she was hit in the back by a bullet during the explosion and she recalls being shot by a sniper and watching everyone who tried to help her be killed. Iain realises Chrissie was affected by seeing the van fall with him inside it and they reunite.
1232	20	"Ena"	Roberto Bangura	Lindsey Alford	5 February 2022	N/A (<4.17)
Paula goes into labour at the caravan she is hiding in and her landlady insists on calling the ambulance. Dylan and Jan arrive and help her give birth to a baby girl, who she names Ena, but take them both in after she faints. Since she tried to conceal a high risk birth from social services, Adi has no option but to take the baby into care. Marty sympathises and arranges a date with him. A blind woman is brought in after a fall at home. Robyn suspects her girlfriend is abusing her, especially when she falls into a ravine soon after being discharged. In fact, her guide dog is out of practice after being stuck inside during lockdown and failed to guide her away from the edge. The woman accepts the dog will have to be retired and gets engaged to her girlfriend. Robyn discovers she is pregnant, confiding in Paige that the father is a man she dated casually who has now moved away.
1233	21	"The Choice"	Roberto Bangura	Barbara Machin	12 February 2022	N/A
Robyn tells Paige she can't afford another baby. She confides in Charlie, who suggests she and Charlotte move in with him. She is involved with treating a man who was badly burned with acid and isn't expected to survive. He admits he walked out on his boyfriend and adopted son; his family refuse to visit him but he does receive a video message from his son before he dies. An under pressure Paige discharges a woman brought in with a suspected stroke when she seems fine, only for her to come back in with a full-blown stroke. Robyn goes to an abortion clinic but goes back to work after taking the pill instead of resting and ends up collapsing. David arranges time off on full pay.
1234	22	"On the Edge"	Paul Riordan	Naylah Ahmed and Stephen McAteer	19 February 2022	N/A
Faith forgets to arrange for someone to pick Luka up from football training and he ends up accepting a lift from a stranger, Darren, who claims to be a football scout. Teddy and Sah visit Bill, an old friend of Sah's father who is having an angina attack, but he refuses transport, saying his wife Jean will look after him. He later tries to drive himself to hospital. Darren touches Luka's leg and he grabs the car wheel, causing them to crash into Bill's car. Adi reveals that Bill has Alzheimer's and Jean died five years ago. Sah sits with him as he dies and explains to Teddy that they met when Sah's father was in rehab after a stroke: They have been his carer since they were fifteen. Darren tries to get Luka to stay quiet by claiming he and Faith will get into trouble. Faith, Stevie and Adi work together to get Luka to admit what happened and Darren is arrested.
1235	23	"Balancing the Books"	Paul Riordan	Hilary Frankland	26 February 2022	N/A
Matthew hits Stevie in his sleep while having a nightmare. Stevie treats a teenager who apparently fell and hit her dead. She realises her mother threw a bottle at her and refers her to Adi. Dylan tells Stevie that Paige has taken time off to care for her mother. Marty panics when Adi suggests looking for a flat together. He accompanies Jan on the ambulance and they are called out to the scene when a prisoner in jail after he ran over and killed a boy gets involved in another prison's escape attempt during a transfer. The prison van crashes and both the prisoner and a female guard are injured. Matthew takes charge at the scene and prioritises the guard, thinking she has internal bleeding, but it turns out to be a fractured pelvis. Both patients survive. Matthew has flashbacks to being in a war zone and turns out to be keeping lists of patients he has and hasn't saved.
1236	24	"Apron Strings"	Matt Hilton	Rachel Harper	26 February 2022	N/A
A woman searching for her missing daughter falls off a bridge. Teddy cuts his hand looking for the daughter. The daughter turns up at the hospital: She hasn't seen her mother in weeks following an argument since when her mother has had a series of TIAs and fails to recognise her. Teddy is visited by his mother Gaynor, who is staying with him, and tries to build bridges between her and Jan. David stops Paul selling holistic medicine but Teddy buys some. Robyn is dropping Charlotte off at school when she sees another girl fall from a tree and accidentally strangle herself. Robyn looks after her until she gets to hospital but her lungs have been weakened by asthma and she dies in Resus. Robyn learns the area around the school has dangerous high levels of pollution and resolves to do something.
1237	25	"Balancing the Scales"	Matt Hilton	Simon Norman	5 March 2022	3.30
Matthew treats a man injured in a car crash and insists on tying off a vein in his leg, which the surgeons eventually save. Ethan and Marty treat a bigoted man with no legs for a scalded arm: He is looked after by his son. They call in Adi after discovering old injuries and it turns out the son caused the scald by throwing a cup at a wall. Adi wants to report it but Ethan and Marty decide to admit him on a pretext to give the pair a break. Rhys, a young man who takes items from house clearances, tries to sell a painting to a couple, Camilla and Tom, but Tom tries to take it by force. Rhys ends up falling through rotting floorboards and Camilla stays to help, revealing the painting is worth £30,000 and offering to split it. She gets him to hospital where Matthew believes his claim to have fallen off a wall and only orders an x-ray. Robyn gets the truth and it turns out his chest was crushed, with him dying in Resus. Matthews shows Rash how he keeps a list of people he fails to save, crossing names off when he saves someone. In flashbacks, it is revealed that Matthew tried to take a man injured in an explosion in Africa to hospital only for militants to kill both the patient and a fellow aid worker.
1238	26	"Now, I Can Breathe"	Judith Dine	Sean Robert Daniels and Stephen McAteer	12 March 2022	3.10
Iain and Chrissie rescue Keidi, a man who was tied up and dumped in the river. At the hospital, he is found to have other injuries and an infected stab wound. Ffion deduces he is a victim of modern slavery. A man turns up to threaten him; Iain chases him and gets his arm slashed. Keidi explains his sister Elvira is still being held before dying in Resus. Anya, young woman in a wheelchair, calls an ambulance when her friend Mersana starts coughing up blood but has difficulty describing where they are. Mersana has liver failure from past binge drinking and Anya intends to be a donor. Anya has brain damage from a childhood accident and her father thinks she isn't up to making the decision but eventually accepts her choice. Robyn is trying to get in touch with the council about the environment. Paul tells her a councillor is visiting the hospital and Robyn gets her to agree to traffic control around the school.
1239	27	"Break Your Heart"	Judith Dine	Lisa McMullin	19 March 2022	3.26
A young woman, Kezzie, returns home after spending three years in jail for drug possession. Her brother AJ ends up a tree hallucinating. Jan and Teddy are called to the scene and Teddy climbs the tree after him but blacks out and falls. Kezzie recalls how her mother Sadie used to drug her and realises she gave AJ ecstasy by mistake and also planted drugs in Kezzie's bag, leading to her arrest. She sends Sadie away. Teddy is found to have a heart murmur and will need surgery. Gaynor makes him promise to give up work. Adi checks on Jess, a pregnant friend who was pushed over, and doesn't tell Marty they're having the baby together. Rosa hears her mother is ill and flies out to her.
1240	28	"Trigger"	Dan Berlinka	Dan Berlinka	26 March 2022	2.88
Paul faces a disciplinary hearing over selling the supplements and helping Robyn ambush the councillor. He is dismissed but realises that a student who claimed to have food poisoning has actually taken speed, prompting Dylan to agree to put in a good word for him. A man who wakes up to find his girlfriend packing to leave him deliberately gets a glass shard in his hand so she'll stay, then accidentally cuts her throat with it. Matthew insists on treating the wound himself instead of just stabilising her for surgery. Stevie thinks he's being reckless because of PTSD and tries to get him to talk to Dylan but instead he makes a sexual harassment complain against her. Her case isn't helped when he saves the patient from a further bleed.
1241	29	"Judgement Call"	Merlyn Rice	Philip Ralph	2 April 2022	3.10
A young farmer rolls a tractor onto herself. Her husband was about to hang himself but is summoned by her screams. Jan comes across secretive behaviour at a nearby farm while looking for them. At the hospital, the husband admits they have never managed to get the farm working after inheriting it from his father-in-law. His wife learns she is pregnant and decides to sell the farm to a large conglomerate. Iain goes to the other farm and is warned off by Pat, the man running it. He follows a woman he thinks is Elvira into a barn but ends up trapped in a grain silo as it fills up. Chrissie rescues him and Ffion learns the workers and managers have all disappeared. Chrissie tells Iain she's asked for a transfer because she doesn't want to be around when his luck runs out. Holly investigates the complaint against Stevie. Paula is visited by Dawn, a friend with a burned arm who asks her to hide the fact she was drinking so she doesn't get thrown out of sheltered accommodation. Dylan thinks Paula has been drinking again but Dawn admits the truth and Dylan offers to support Paula at a forthcoming custody hearing.
1242	30	"I Will Trust in You"	Merlyn Rice	Sam Holdsworth and Dana Fainaru	9 April 2022	N/A
Takes place over the course of five days. Dylan and Jan support Paula at a custody hearing where Adi agrees to her looking after Ena with some safeguarding in place. Paula has difficulty dealing with her social worker and with Ena developing a rash but is left in a more positive place. Marty helps a transgender teen admitted after mixing drugs and alcohol and learns her mother forces her to dress as male at home and hides her gender identity from her father, a vicar. She is eventually brought in after taking a drug overdose in a suicide attempt, her prospects uncertain, and her father is upset she wasn't given support. Jessica is brought in with placenta praevia and Adi admits to Marty she is having the baby for him as a surrogate.
1243	31	"Friends Like These"	Alex Jacob	Da Nixon	16 April 2022	N/A
Brother and sister Dane and Kayley spy on Al with a drone. Al is later found injured while Kayley impales her foot on a branch. Gaynor has convinced Teddy to go through with his resignation but he stops to help Al. Al slips away from the hospital and Matthew realises he has a subdural haematoma. Teddy helps track him down and changes his mind about the resignation, with Gaynor going back to Manchester alone. Kayley discovers drone footage of Dean attacking Al without provocation and gives it to the police. Faith treats Holly when she feels stiff exercising and learns cosmetic surgery has resulted in fat getting into her lungs. Holly gives Stevie details of a union rep.
1244	32	"Burning Love"	Alex Jacob	David Bowker	23 April 2022	N/A
Matthew comes across a cottage on fire while out running. He catches a baby thrown from a window and drags the mother out but has to let fire crews rescue her husband. Matthew and Stevie both speak to the tribunal, with Stevie bringing up her belief Matthew has PTSD. Matthew freezes up while treating the baby while Stevie helps save the father. The mother admits she probably started the fire by burning letters to her husband from his ex-wife out of jealousy; he is still in touch with her because she understands his depression better. Matthew withdraws the complaint and Dylan gives him leave while he serves out his notice, but also criticises Stevie's handling of him. Paige returns to work. Adi brings in Jessica with bleeding and talks to Marty about his dream of being a father. The baby is revealed to have died.
1245	33	"Road to Nowhere"	Hildegard Ryan	Naomi Soneye-Thomas	30 April 2022	2.60
Iain checks out a farm and sees Pat Harner there. Harner flees and is hit by a lorry. Another lorry drops off a trailer with a group of workers locked inside at the farm, including a pregnant woman in labour. Finding a message about it on Harner's phone, Iain hurries back to the farm and summons the police and back-up, getting everyone to hospital safely. Ffion arrests Harner but warns Iain that Elvira could be at dozens of places. David gives Ollie's class a tour of the hospital. Class bully Dan and his girlfriend Louise convince Ollie to sneak away with them, stealing entonox from an ambulance and taking it. Ollie falls and hits his head. David reports the group, resulting in Dan being suspended and missing a football game that a scout is attending. Dan gets his own back by posting a video humiliating Ollie.
1246	34	"First Date"	Hildegard Ryan	Kevin Rundle	30 April 2022	N/A
Ethan shares an awkward date with a policewoman, Amy, and tells her about a case he worked on nine months earlier, where he tried to build bridges between a teenager involved in a gang and his father. Fenisha later brought in the teenager after he had been stabbed and Ethan was unable to save him. Two weeks ago, Ethan met the father again when Amy brought him in as a suspect in a break and enter with a suspected head injury. He disappeared before it turned out he had a bleed on the brain and, after he fell out of a ventilation shaft, Ethan saved him. Amy reveals she has a daughter and had to take out a restraining order against her ex-husband. She and Ethan conclude they're not ready to date.
1247	35	"Dark Room"	Carys Lewis	Ed Sellek	7 May 2022	2.64
Sah marks their birthday with their father Kevin but tears up a card from their estranged mother. A woman, Willow, attacks her son Scott on finding him in the house before spilling acid over herself. Iain and Sah collect the pair separately. Scott used to bully Sah at school and has an old injury from when they retaliated and hit him with a skateboard. He provokes Sah into nearly hitting him at the hospital but later confides in them that his mother rejected him and his sister, who suspects she was raped in order to conceive them. Dylan and Jan try to discipline Sah but Stevie and Scott defend them. Ollie and his friend Rob try to get revenge on Dan by vandalising his car but are chased by the police, with Rob impaling his leg on a nail. After talking to Rob about how they stand up to bullies together, David gives his blessing to the friendship.
1248	36	"Found You"	Amanda Mealing	Toby Walton	21 May 2022	2.47
Elvira and her friend Mariam are among the slaves working at a car wash. She has heard Iain is looking for her so drinks anti-freeze, prompting the customers to call an ambulance. The head of the operation hides her from Iain and Teddy but she gets free and is run over in front of them. The slaves' supervisor is sent in posing as a patient to kill her but is stopped by Rash and Paige and reveals his family have been threatened. Iain stops Mariam and the others being moved again and the head man is arrested. Rash asks Paige out; she reveals her mother died six weeks ago but later kisses him.
1249	37	"Never Alone"	Justin Edgar	Berri George and Colin Bytheway	28 May 2022	N/A
Rash and Paige turn up late after spending the night together. They try to keep their relationship secret but eventually confess to Dylan. Natalia turns up with a friend, Georgie, who has had a skateboarding accident. Faith learns Natalia has an older boyfriend, Tristan, but doesn't know Georgie is pressuring her into sleeping with him. Iain finds a woman, Heather, in a confused state in the woods, having taken an overdose. It transpires her husband Martin died in a car crash two years ago and she disappeared soon afterwards. Her pregnant stepdaughter Carla arrives and Heather admits she fled when the car caught fire, leaving Martin to die. She douses herself with petrol but David talks her out of committing suicide and she is reconciled with Carla. However, this stops David giving attention to a distressed Ollie, who is told by Rob that he can only count on him.
1250	38	"By Any Means"	David Innes Edwards	Rebekah Harrison	11 June 2022	N/A
A group of climate change protesters are blocking a motorway. A 14-year-old girl is taken into hospital after having her glued hand ripped off the tarmac. Her father is worried about her behaviour and wants to send her away to an aunt. She continues to protest at the hospital but her mood changes when another girl from the protest is brought in after being hit by a car. It is revealed they are a couple and her father accepts the relationship. Marty and Adi have another surrogacy meeting but Jessica feels she can't go through it again. Robyn considers being their surrogate instead. A boy comes in after deliberately drinking salt water. It transpires his mother is being forced to sleep with their landlord to pay the rent and the boy was trying to keep her away from him. Paige is delaying booking a BRCA gene test but accepts when Rash books it for her. She finds a terminally ill man who just wants to go home but is unable to get a care package in place, so sits with him as he dies.
1251 (Note: "Wednesday's Child" is a feature length episode with a runtime of 75 minutes.)	39 (Note: "Wednesday's Child" was set to air on 11 June 2022 as episode 38 but was pulled from the schedule due to the Robb Elementary School shooting. It was instead broadcast as episode 39 on 18 June 2022.)	"Wednesday's Child"	Judith Dine	Hilary Frankland and Stephen McAteer	18 June 2022	2.47
Reports arrive of a shooting take place at the local school. The perpetrators turn out to be Rob and Ollie. A boy who led his class in making a run for it is killed and their teacher, Kerry, is shot after going after them. When she arrives in hospital, Paul reveals she is his ex-fiance. Dylan prioritises patients with a better chance of survival and she dies with Paul by her side. Louise is killed and a boy, Jamie, falls into an orchestra pit, lying undiscovered for hours until he manages to phone his mother, who was looking for him at the hospital. Ollie sees Natalia hiding but lets her go. Rob shoots him and is then shot by the police, dying in Resus. David refuses to believe Ollie was involved, despite Natalie's account and finding he had shotgun cartridges on him, until Ffion says witnesses have identified him. David is blamed by the father of a boy who was killed. Despite Dylan carrying out emergency surgery in Resus, Ollie dies.
1252	40	"Blame Game"	David Innes Edwards	Michelle Lipton	25 June 2022	2.61
Dylan checks on David, whose house has been vandalised and who has broken up with Rosa. David is later brought into hospital after being attacked, with Iain cleaning up his house. Stevie clashes with anaesthetist Jonty Buchanan when he causes a tension pneumothorax while putting a central line in. Jonty is looking after a boy who has been in a coma since the shooting and has brain damage when he comes round. His mother Claire threatens David with a scalpel until Ffion restores order. Stevie and Faith treat a woman who fell down an escalator at the airport; she and her boyfriend are due to get married in Mexico, but she has an accident every time they try. Stevie diagnoses her with an inner ear infection and they race off to their flight. Rash, Marty and Paul look after a boy who brings in a dead gerbil, with Marty fooling him with a replacement. Stevie suggests Dylan hand over the clinical lead responsibilities so he can concentrate on David, only for him to give them to Ethan.
1253	41	"One In, One Out"	Duncan Foster	Toby Walton	25 June 2022	2.63
Stevie visits Emma's memorial bench on her birthday and runs into Marcus. Dylan asks her to take charge of a shift while Ethan has childcare issues. A young woman crashes her birthday car after suffering a seizure, killing her mother: She had been undergoing an investigation for epilepsy. Charlie criticises Stevie for letting her see her mother's body. Stevie argues with GP Jools Bockner who turns out to be Sah's estranged mother. Sah reluctantly takes her number and Iain later helps them realise she's been in contact with Kevin. An elderly man and woman hold up a shopkeeper with a cap gun and steal some chocolate. They end up in hospital after the man coughs up blood. Rash and Paige learn they are stoned and the man has terminal cancer and only has weeks to live; the woman is a friend of his late wife and secretly in love with him. Stevie has another row with Jonty, and Ethan is called in to take over, implying the staff complained about her. Marcus finds Stevie getting drunk and she kisses him.
1254	42	"Parental Guidance"	Piotr Szkopiak	Rachel Harper	2 July 2022	2.87
Natalia's boyfriend Tristan calls an ambulance for her, saying she suffered a fit. In fact, they had been convinced to try consensual strangulation during sex. Faith initially blames David for the stress Ollie put Natalia under but later accepts it was her own choice. A student tells her friend she has been offered an internship in Barcelona. He confesses he loves her, then accidentally severs her fingers with a sword. Stevie is assigned to look after her but is distracted when Paul faints and an oddly-behaving girl takes one. David finds the girl hiding in a cupboard and tells her mother, who earlier banned him from treating her, not to let her grow up lonely. The fingers are reattached and the student admits she had been avoiding her friend because she knew how he felt and didn't reciprocate. Several of the staff attend Ollie's funeral to support David but he ends up not attending himself after seeing Louise's grave.
1255 (Note: "No Good Deed" is a feature length episode with a runtime of 75 minutes.)	43	"No Good Deed"	Michael Lacey	Michelle Lipton	16 July 2022	2.76
David moves into a new flat to escape harassment but it is immediately hit by an explosion. He helps treat some of the wounded including Joyce, a confused elderly woman, an elderly man who has just had dementia and paranoid Joyce. A young woman goes into labour and the baby is delivered in hospital. Teddy organises a collection for the couple and the woman is unimpressed when her boyfriend, who has a gambling problems, uses it to win a big bet. Stevie and Jonty clash when he makes a mistake treating Lyra. Marcus has joined the hospital as a management consultant and takes Stevie's side, convincing Jonty to give up his locum position. Callum, who befriended David, goes back to look for Lyra's dog and he, David and Jan end up trapped together, with Callum having a tension pneumothorax and Jan a badly cut arm. Iain and the fire crews free them. David learns the explosion was caused by someone tampering with the gas pipes. Callum admits to fixing Joyce's meter and intends to tell the police to see if he caused it. He convinces Joyce to let social services house her. Marty and Adi arrange a surrogate appointment and Robyn agrees to help out. Paul is disappointed she didn't talk to him.
1256	44	"Survivor"	Piotr Szkopiak	Lydia Marchant	13 August 2022	2.58
A college student is found collapsed in a hallway and eventually realises she was raped. She is worried how her strict Muslim brother will react but after a clash with Sah he supports her. Ethan and Rash treat a man with motor neuron disease who was brought in by his fiance. She believed he choked but he actually took an overdose. He has a care plan in place to prevent treatment but it doesn't cover suicide attempts. His fiance is convinced to talk to him. Rash learns Paige has tested positive for BRCA gene but she refuses to have a mastectomy. Sah is uncomfortable that Kevin and Jools are back together, especially when Jools suggests their gender dysmorphia was her fault. They eventually decide to support the couple but also to move out.
