= Cardinal Newman Catholic High School, Warrington =

Cardinal Newman Catholic High School

Location
- Bridgewater Avenue; Latchford, Cheshire; Warrington, Cheshire, WA4 1RX; England; 53°23′20″N 2°33′43″W

Information
- Type: Voluntary aided school
- Religious affiliation: Roman Catholic
- Local authority: Warrington Borough Council
- Department for Education URN: 111456 Tables
- Ofsted: Reports
- Chair: Julie M Johnson
- Head teacher: Simon Atkin
- Gender: Coeducational
- Age: 11 to 16
- Website: cardinal-newman.org.uk

Cardinal Newman Catholic High School is a coeducational Roman Catholic secondary school. It is graded by Ofsted as a 'Good' school, and educates approximately 855 children between 11 and 16 years of age. It is in the town of Warrington in Cheshire, England. In June 2017, a small fire was found in a ground floor room which caused Firefighters from Warrington and Stockton Heath station to attend.

== Notable pupils ==
- Emil Majstrak, a WFC world champion, and ASFO British champion, in Muay Thai
- Gabriella Leon, an actress who portrayed Jade Lovall in the BBC medical drama series Casualty
- Lewis McGibbon, an actor who portrayed Anthony in the 2004 Danny Boyle movie Millions.
