= Maryland (2022 film) =

British Television film

- Genre: Drama
- Created by: Lucy Kirkwood
- Based on: Maryland by Lucy Kirkwood
- Written by: Lucy Kirkwood
- Screenplay by: Lucy Kirkwood
- Directed by: Brian Hill
- Starring: Hayley Squires; Zawe Ashton; Daniel Mays
- Original language: English

Production
- Producer: Caroline Levy
- Cinematography: Susanne Salavati

Maryland is a British dramatic television film written by Lucy Kirkwood, based on Kirkwood’s play of the same name which was staged at the Royal Court in London in October 2021. The drama was expanded for television and broadcast in the UK on 20 July 2022, on BBC 2.

== Synopsis ==
Squires and Ashton are 2 women, both called Mary, attacked by the same man on the same day. They meet at a police station as they report their attacks.

== Cast ==
- Hayley Squires as Mary
- Zawe Ashton as Mary
- Daniel Mays as PC Moody
- Justine Mitchell
- Zainab Hasan
- Jennifer Joseph
- Sarah Lam
- Gabriella Leon
- Sarah Woodward

== Production ==
The play was written in the aftermath of the death of school teacher Sabina Nessa and other male violence against women, including the murders of Sarah Everard, Bibaa Henry, Nicole Smallman and Zara Elena in a short space of time in England. Kirkwood was quoted as saying it was “a howl against the way we have normalised violence against women as something to be accommodated by women themselves, rather than protested by all of us” and “the way that women, especially women of colour, cannot at present even rely on the forces of law and order to protect or respect their bodies.”

== Broadcast ==
The programme was broadcast in the UK in July 2022 on BBC 2.

== Reception ==
In The Guardian Lucy Mangan described a “rage-filled, agonisingly truthful drama [that] makes every syllable count.. Maryland is weeks, months, years, generations of pain and fury distilled into something truly powerful. I would like to see a recording or a script pressed into the hands of every schoolgirl, to arm them for the struggle. And every schoolboy. Because not all men, but more men than you think.” In The Independent Rachel Sigee said “Squires and Ashton are exceptional…Kirkwood’s bold, lyrical script pulsates with simmering rage and sparks of dark, droll humour. There is catharsis as it points a trembling finger of fury at a world that allows a woman to be killed by a man every three days.” The Evening Standard’s Natasha Tripney said “The film does not have the immediacy of the stage play… it still feels horribly, depressingly necessary.”
