= Gabriella Leon =

English actress

- Born: 29 March 1996 (age 30); Warrington, Cheshire, England
- Education: Cardinal Newman High School; Priestley College; East 15 Acting School
- Occupation: Actress
- Years active: 2014–present
- Television: Casualty

Gabriella Leon (born 29 March 1996) is an English actress, known for her role as Jade Lovall in the BBC medical drama series Casualty. Leon is deaf and portrayed the first regular deaf character on Casualty. For her portrayal of Jade, she was nominated for a TRIC Award for Soap Actor of the Year.

== Early life ==
Leon was born on 29 March 1996. She was born "moderately deaf", and has learnt British Sign Language. She attended Cardinal Newman High School and Priestley College, later training as an actress at East 15 Acting School. After graduating in 2016 with a BA (Hons) from East 15, Leon began working with theatre company We Are Kilter.

== Career ==
Leon made her professional debut as Julia in a show at the 2014 Commonwealth Games opening ceremony. In 2015, she made her screen debut as Maria Alpert in the drama film Connections: The Marcello Story. She then continued to make stage appearances in productions such as Little Revolution (2015), Tesla (2016), The Lesson (2017) and Close (2018). Her performance in The Others (2018), which she devised, was praised by critics, with Jeremy Mortimer of BBC Radio describing it as "brilliant and inventive".

In May 2018, Leon auditioned for the role of Jade Lovall in the BBC medical drama series Casualty; she was informed in July of that year that she had got the role, and began filming later that month. Her casting was announced on 4 October 2018, and she made her debut appearance on 3 November 2018. She described her character as a "bolshie, chaotic loveable rogue, with a lot of her own flaws. She's a little work-shy and plays by her own rules. She wants to get things right when wanting to impress her mentors but is clumsy. She's cheeky, a real party girl and great fun to be around – if you're on the right side of her! I think she's funny though and also very relatable." Leon portrays the first regular deaf character on Casualty, and in an interview with Inside Soap, she said: "It is so lovely to play someone like me. I'm able to add such depth and understanding to Jade, having experienced most of what she has experienced regarding her disability. I feel proud to be the first disabled regular in the show's history." In 2021, Leon received a nomination for Soap Actor of the Year for her portrayal of Jade. In September 2021, Leon departed from the cast of Casualty. Then in February 2022, she portrayed the role of Pollie Grisham in an episode of the BBC series Shakespeare & Hathaway: Private Investigators. Later that year, Leon starred in the film Maryland, as well as portraying Audrey in a production of As You Like It at the @sohoplace theatre.

== Stage ==
Year	Title	Role	Venue
2014	Commonwealth Games opening ceremony	Julia	Glasgow Athletes Village
2015	Myth	Sarah	RSC Commissioned
2016	Little Revolution	Bling Girl	East 15 Acting School
2016	Tesla	JP Morgan	The Alchemist
2016	A Winter's Tale	Young Shepherd	Propellor
2017	Can Can	Ines	Told by an Idiot
2017	Mondegreen	Rudy	Ryft Styx
2017	The Unko Yuutsu Women's Cabaret	Love Poet	The Crazy Coqs
2017	The Lesson	The Pupil	Corbett Theatre
2017	Mindshare Huddle	Jezebell	Sky Media
2018	Signal House	Maddie	The Landor Space
2018	The Others	Josephine	Camden People's Theatre
2022	The Red Tree	Performer	Red Earth Theatre
2022	As You Like It	Audrey	@sohoplace

== Filmography ==
Year	Title	Role	Notes
2015	Connections: The Marcello Story	Maria Alpert	Film
2018–2021	Casualty	Jade Lovall	Series regular
2022	Shakespeare & Hathaway: Private Investigators	Pollie Grisham	Episode: "Some Cupid Kills"
2022	Maryland	Fury	Film

== Awards and nominations ==
Year	Award	Category	Nominated work	Result	Ref.
2021	TRIC Awards	Soap Actor of the Year	Casualty	Nominated	
