= Uriel Emil =

Israeli actor (born 1975)

Uriel Emil אוריאל אמיל
- Born: Uriel Emil Pollack; 4 April 1975 (age 51); Haifa, Israel
- Occupation: Actor
- Years active: 2000–present
- Television: The Great Fire; Cleaning Up; Casualty
- Spouse: Ragga Gudrun
- Children: 1
- Website: urielemil.uk

Uriel Emil Pollack (Hebrew: אוריאל אמיל פולק; born 4 April 1975) is an Israeli actor, known for his roles as Signor Romero on the ITV drama series The Great Fire (2014), Viktor on the ITV drama series Cleaning Up (2019), and Lev Malinovsky on the BBC medical drama Casualty (2019–2021).

== Filmography ==
Year	Title	Role	Notes
2007	Spies, Lies and the Superbomb	Agent Uriel	Credited as Uriel Emil Pollack
2007	The Bourne Ultimatum	Morgue Attendant	
2009	Criminal Justice	Doctor	
2010	Spooks	Banketik	Episode: #9.6
2012	Hunted	Hasan Moussa	
2014	The Great Fire	Signor Romero	
2014	The Honourable Woman	Shimon Ben Reuven	Episode: "Two Hearts"
2015	Homeland	Radwan	
2019	Silent Witness	Ramush	Episode: "Lift Up Your Hearts"
2019	We Die Young	"Spider"	
2019	Cleaning Up	Viktor	
2019–2021	Casualty	Lev Malinovsky	Series regular
2020	Wildfire	Christopher	Film
2023	Vikings: Valhalla		
2023	Secret Invasion	Vasily Poprishchin	2 episodes
2023	Culprits	Malek	
