= Jade Lovall =

- Casualty character
- Gabriella Leon as Jade Lovall
- First appearance: Episode 1105; 3 November 2018
- Last appearance: "The Road Less Travelled"; 18 September 2021
- Portrayed by: Gabriella Leon

In-universe information
- Occupation: Staff nurse (prev. Student nurse)
- Family: Susie Ashby (mother); Theresa Ashby (grandmother)
- Significant other: Malc Denison; Toby Damron

Jade Lovall is a fictional character from the BBC medical drama Casualty, portrayed by actress Gabriella Leon. She first appears in the twelfth episode of the thirty-third series, first broadcast on 3 November 2018. Leon was cast in June 2018 alongside Shaheen Jafargholi, who portrays Marty Kirkby. The role marks the actress' television debut. Initially portrayed as lazy and idle, Jade's characterisation develops as she is shown to be an independent, caring and compassionate young woman. Jade is the drama's first disabled, and deaf, regular character; Leon is also deaf and used her personal experiences to develop her character's story. The character uses a combition of Sign Supported English (SSE) and lip reading to communicate. Producers and Leon were keen to not make her disability a defining feature of the character.

Jade is introduced as a student nurse completing her final placement on Holby City Hospital's maternity ward. Senior nurse Louise Tyler (Azuka Oforka) recognises her talent and invites her to finish her placement at the emergency department (ED), where writers paired her with Marty in a double act tackling their first months in the ED together. First used for light relief against the show's serious stories, the pair were later subject to more delicate stories as Jade becomes a registered nurse and Marty comes out to his family. Off-screen, Leon and Jafargholi liked working together and even moved in together.

The character's biggest story explored her fictional backstory in foster care and deafness. Leon dubbed it "a story of acceptance". One episode uses British Sign Language (BSL) in scenes between Jade and her former boyfriend, with subtitles used for non-BSL speakers. The story culminates in the special episode "Jade's World", written, directed and starring deaf creatives in a first for British history. The episode sees Jade meet her biological mother, Susie Ashby (Sophie Leigh Stone), who she learns is also deaf. "Jade's World" was lauded by television critics and viewers alike.

Producers used the character to highlight the issue of drink spiking and how people with disabilities face additional barriers daily. After having her drink spiked in a club, Jade is nearly assaulted in an alleyway. She is traumatised by the attack and initially seeks revenge. The character's reasons for becoming a nurse were explored in the show's thirty-sixth anniversary, followed by a revenge plot against Jade from Stevie Nash (Elinor Lawless). Leon opted to leave Casualty after three years and Jade departs in the thirty-sixth series episode "The Road Less Travelled", first broadcast on 18 September 2021. The character was well received by television critics and viewers alike. In particular, the representation of deaf people created by the character was praised.

== Casting ==
In August 2018, Casualty series producer Lucy Raffety announced the casting of actress Gabriella Leon in the role of student nurse Jade, in an interview with Sophie Dainty of entertainment website Digital Spy. Raffety called Leon a "brilliant actress". Further details about the character were announced on 3 October 2018 by Duncan Lindsay, writing for the Metro. Simon Harper, the executive producer of Casualty, described Leon as "a phenomenal new talent and an utter joy as Jade". Leon found Harper's comments "sweet", but said they made her feel under pressure.

Auditions for the role of Jade took place across May and June 2018. The casting call for the role requested women with a disability that did not define them, and upon seeing this, Leon, who is deaf, decided to read for it. She dubbed the part "written just for [her]". Her agent told her that she had won the role while she was at the pub with her friend. The actress worried that she would not get the role as she had not heard anything until that point. On discovering the news, she said, "It was a really special moment that I don't think I'll ever forget in my life." Leon began filming at the show's studios, based in Cardiff, in July. Leon joined the cast alongside actor Shaheen Jafargholi, who portrays Marty Kirkby. She was pleased about this and dubbed him her "partner in crime". Casualty marks Leon's television debut and having previously performed in theatre, she found the transition to television "smooth" and enjoyed learning from her co-stars. The actress found the experience of joining the drama "surreal" and likened it to "a lucid dream". She also opined that joining the show was a "refreshing" experience.

Leon sometimes struggled to learn the medical terminology involved with the show and to help her learn them, she would turn phrases into songs or taps. She also compared learning basic medical procedures to learning choreography. The actress found the show's set overwhelming and would often become lost in it. She compared her first day on-set to "learning a new language". As part of her research for the role, Leon watched series 31 and series 32 of Casualty to help deepen her knowledge of the show.

== Development ==
=== Characterisation ===
Jade is funny and down to earth, without any ego. She's up for anything; life is nothing more than a series of experiences and she's going to make sure hers are fun ones. Jade never judges others and is a great laugh to share a bottle - or several - with. Jade isn't one for rules or detail and constantly cuts corners to take the easiest route out – some might say she's lazy... but deep down this attitude is masking a host of insecurities – for Jade, if you never put yourself on the line, you can never be a failure.

— An excerpt from Jade's profile on the official Casualty website.

Jade is initially characterised as a "work-shy" student nurse who "plays by her own rules". She has a "thrill seeking nature" and is keen to avoid any additional responsibility. She dislikes rules and detail and will often "[cut] corners", which makes people perceive her as lazy and avoid working with her. However, this persona hides Jade's insecurities: she is not confident in her ability and believes that you cannot fail if you do not "put yourself on the line". Leon thought that Jade makes a good nurse and could reach her "full potential" if she tackled her insecurities. She also opined that Jade is a flawed "loveable rouge", but explained that her flaws are "very universal and endearing", which make her likeable.

Jade is a humanist and treats her patients with "compassion". She works confidently and does not falter in any situation, even when dealing with bloodied trauma patients. Leon felt that she "really cares" about patients and her team. The character is portrayed as independent. Leon said she was "unapologetically herself". She is unafraid to stand up from injustice. Jade does not have an ego and is a nonjudgemental and "down to earth" person who makes friends with everyone. Harper billed Jade as "chaotic, funny, [bolshie] and vulnerable", while Leon described her as "cheeky", flirtatious and a "party girl". The actress is a trained clown and liked to incorporate elements of comedy into the character. She noted that Jade is a "relatable" character, and concluded, "she's just an all-round fabulous nurse, friend and ally to have".

The character is portrayed as a strong, independent young woman. Leon thought that writers had established a "fun role for a young woman", which she liked as it showcased female voices and stories about women. In a feature about "iconic women of soap", Leon said that Jade was "unapologetically herself" and does not let anything stop her. She told Sue Haasler from the Metro that Jade is a "chaotic whirlwind of a young woman". Reflecting on her own experience as Jade, Leon was pleased that women in soap were given more of a central stage, rather than being secondary to the stories of male characters.

The character's fictional backstory states that she began living in foster care aged eight and spent her childhood moving between care homes and foster families. She then "defied all the odds" by studying at university and becoming a nurse. Jade's complicated upbringing caused her to not allow people to get close to her and develop commitment issues. In relationships, she enjoys flirting but will quickly end the relationship if things become serious. Leon explained that the character has become used to rejection as she grew up, which has made her "resilient". The actress felt she could relate to this due to her own experiences with her disability.

=== Disability ===
"She is a shining example of someone who is not defined by her invisible disability or her troubled upbringing and, despite the odds, has achieved what she has."

—Leon on the representation her character brings.

Jade is the first disabled - and first deaf - regular character on Casualty. Leon felt proud of this fact and did not want her character to be defined by her disability. She thought it was important that characters, like Jade, with a disability were not just "used as 'disabled characters' but 'characters that happen to have a disability'". Jade was the first character Leon portrayed to have the same disability as her. To ensure an accurate portrayal of Jade's disability, Leon works with the show's story team, drawing from her own personal experience. She also encouraged the use of deaf creatives whenever there was a focus on her character's disability to increase authenticity. The actress praised Casualty's representation of invisible disability and opined that they were showcasing "a much broader scope of who someone with a disability is". Jade uses a combition of Sign Supported English (SSE) and lip reading to communicate, in comparison to Leon who primarily uses lip reading. Interpreters are used during the writing process and on set to ensure relevant signs are used for Jade and the other correspondent. Leon felt that as a deaf actress, she could add "depth and understanding" to the role, having shared experiences with her character.

As part of the condition, Jade has hyperacusis, which is a sensitivity to sound above a certain volume and frequency. Triggers to this include the swinging doors in the ED and metal bins, which Jade has to ignore on a daily basis. Leon felt that Jade was a good representation of deaf nurses in the NHS. She wanted to represent an "endearing yet clumsy, deaf nurse" through her character. After learning she had been cast, the actress decided to use the opportunity to "educate and normalise seeing characters with disabilities on screen". Leon felt pressured to accurately represent deaf people through her character, but also noted that her portrayal had created opportunity for other deaf creatives to be involved in the drama. Hearing-impaired fans of the show admitted to Leon that she was the first representation of the hearing-impaired community that they had ever seen on television. She hoped that her portrayal of a deaf character would improve attitudes towards disability.

Through the character of Jade, writers explored the challenges to deaf people created by the use of face masks during the COVID-19 pandemic and in healthcare settings. Leon pointed out that masks restrict communication and it is hard to lip read from two metres away (the required social distance). The actress was pleased that Casualty were showcasing the impact of masks on deaf people. She admitted that she encouraged writers to explore this issue. The issue was first touched upon when the hospital goes into lockdown following a chemical attack. Protective gear prevents Jade from hearing her colleagues properly and she struggles to lipread them, which stops her from treating patients. Producers gave the issue more focus in a special episode exploring the impact of COVID-19 pandemic on the NHS. Series producer Loretta Preece explained that they wanted to draw attention to the issue and was pleased they could so through Jade, who she deemed "a very important character to the show".

=== Introduction ===
Jade first appears in the show's 1105th episode, which is within the thirty-third series, broadcast on 3 November 2018. She is introduced as a student nurse on Holby City Hospital's maternity ward, undertaking her final university placement. Established character Louise Tyler (Azuka Oforka), a senior staff nurse, meets Jade after she arrives at work late and then has a nap on a hospital bed. Prior to this, Jade appears briefly when she vomits in a supermarket while on a night out. Jade fails to order a critical blood test for her patient, leaving Louise appalled. However, she soon warms to Jade after they have to work together in an emergency to save a patient's life. Louise recognises Jade's nursing potential and offers her the chance to change her placement to the hospital's emergency department (ED). Leon thought that Jade's personality was well suited to the ED, so she would be able to "thrive" there. At the end of her first episode, Jade visits the ED. Leon explained that Jade quickly realises that she will work well in the ED as "this is the place for her". The actress hosted a hospital-themed party with her friends to watch her first episode.

Jade begins her placement in the ED alongside fellow student nurse Marty Kirkby (Jafargholi) and they are mentored by Louise. To begin with, Leon and Jafargholi shared a lot of scenes with each other and Oforka. Jafargholi explained that Louise would start "coming down hard" on Jade and Marty when they misbehave. Leon told David Morgan of the Warrington Guardian that Jade would "[add] a new flavour to the ED" as she adjusts to her new work environment, while Jafargholi said that Jade and Marty create an unexpected "burst of energy and life" in the ED. As she progresses through her placement, Jade soon learns that trying to finish her work fast could be her "downfall". However, she soon discovers that working in the ED is tougher than initially expected and she will have to change her laidback attitude. Jade also learns whether the fast-paced nature of the ED will work with her personality. Jafargholi noted that Jade and Marty's young age makes them inexperienced, but they would eventually get "inline" and thrive in their career.

=== Friendship with Marty Kirkby ===
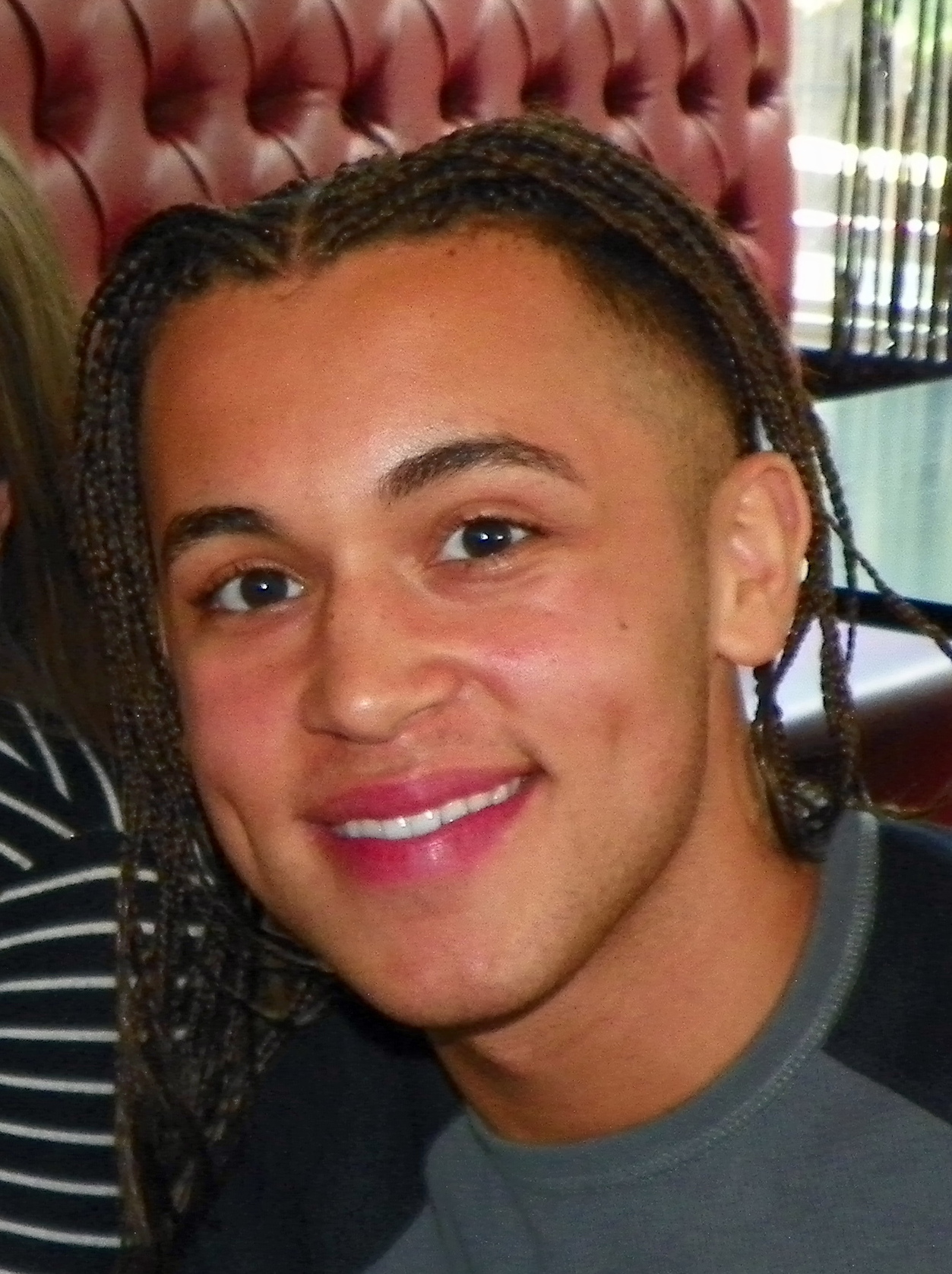
Jade establishes a friendship with Marty Kirkby, portrayed by Shaheen Jafargholi (pictured).

Writers paired Jade with Marty as a double act tackling their first months working in the ED, and used them as light relief for the show's serious storylines. Harper thought that they made a "brilliant, comic partnership", and Raffety opined that Jade and Marty would bring "a whirlwind of life and fun" to the ED. The pair were described as "frenemies" by Leon, who thought they share a deeper connection, stemming from them starting in the ED together. She told Dainty (Digital Spy) that there is a "clash in attitudes and personality" between Jade and Marty, and told Haasler (Metro) that they share an "interesting Clash of the Titans friendship". She added that despite their differences, they would support each other. Within their first episodes, Jade and Marty's relationship is explored "on a friendship level and a work level as colleagues".

They regularly play games and have competitions in their work. Jafargholi explained that Jade and Marty both want to do better than each other, which results in them doing things that they should not do. Jade and Marty soon discover whether their humour will work in the stressful work environment. Jafargholi confirmed that the rivalry would develop into a friendship, but pointed out that they have to understand their "boundaries with one another". Marty often accepts praise for Jade's work. Leon and Jafargholi agreed that the characters were both "sneaky". The actors enjoyed working with each other and felt it made their characters' connection "organic".

Writers implemented a clash for Jade and Marty when they treat Rufus Addams (Kriss Dillon), a patient who they find attractive. Although Marty is assigned to treat Rufus, Jade decides to assist after becoming jealous. When they learn more about Rufus, Jade and Marty become "smitten" and argue over who should be his nurse. They decide to compete for his attention, but Jade takes it "too far" and locks Marty in a cupboard. He is placed in danger when he suffers an asthma attack. Jafargholi explained that the pair's "competitive nature" is the reason Marty has an attack and observed that they would be in a better position if they had supported each other.

In another scenario, Jade's lazy attitude creates problems for her friendship with Marty when he becomes frustrated with Louise associating him with Jade. Upon realising that Jade is "dragging him down", Marty rejects her in favour of his career. His decision occurs after Jade accidentally glues a patient's head to a pillow. Writers continued to test Jade and Marty's relationship by having her move into his share house. Off-screen, Jafargholi and Leon live together in a flat, which the former found to be a reflection of the show.

Writers created a new challenge for Jade and Marty's friendship when they both apply for the same nursing bursary. Jade's self-confidence presents an issue for her as she writes her application and worsens when she learns Marty is also applying, deciding that he is more likely to win. Jade receives support from her colleagues and showcases her capabilities when she treats a patient with a fear of needles. Marty wins the bursary, leaving Jade feeling jealous. She reads Marty's personal statement and is surprised to learn about his childhood and struggles with his sexuality. She is upset and annoyed that Marty has not told her about his past and when his father, Graham Kirkby (Philip Wright), calls, she invites him to the award ceremony. After Marty admits that he is not out to his parents, Jade panics, and claims to be his girlfriend to avoid outing him. Leon called this one of her highlights from her time on Casualty. Jade continues to support Marty and accompanies him to a family party.

When Marty comes out to his parents and is rejected, Jade comforts him. Marty's rejection causes him to neglect his work duties, which consequently affects his friendship with Jade. She does not realise that Marty is struggling and before he can open up to her, she berates him for his behaviour and ends their friendship. Jafargholi explained that Marty relies on Jade too much and takes her for granted. He commented, "Jade keeps getting caught up in Marty's lies, while trying to be a good friend to him." Through Marty's stories, writers continued to focus on his and Jade's friendship, using the character of Jade as a pilar of support for Marty.

=== Career ===
Writers incorporated the character into a story about the nursing staff, which sees Louise fight for the protection of her team. The story commences when an "unstable" patient attacks Jade, leaving her "shaken" and Louise "incandescent with fury" Consequently, Louise gets her nurses to wear body cameras, which has a negative effect when a vulnerable patient does not share important information because she believes Jade is filming her. The plot concludes with Oforka's departure from the show. After a stressful few weeks, Louise chooses to leave, positive that she has taught Jade and Marty "everything she could".

Casualty explored the trialling of maggot therapy in a story which includes Jade and consultant Dylan Keogh (William Beck). When a patient, Campbell Shortis (Thom Jackson-Wood), is admitted to the ED, Dylan decides that maggot therapy would be the best treatment for him. While Marty declines the opportunity to assist, Jade is intrigued and agrees to get involved, to Dylan's surprise. Impressed with her keen nature, Dylan invites Jade to join his trial. The plot was revisited in subsequent episodes as Jade has to juggle between working on the maggot therapy project and helping treat a deaf patient. Jade becomes annoyed that Dylan is not taking her seriously and tries to prove her worth, which she does when she realises her deaf patient has meningitis. Reflecting on the maggot therapy story, Leon named it one of her favourite stories to perform.

The character's career was revisited when she prepares to complete her training and become a registered nurse. Jade learns that she has only just passed her exams, but cannot celebrate due to a staff shortage at the ED. Frustrated, Jade points out that senior nurse Duffy (Cathy Shipton) is not staying to help out, unaware she is struggling with a dementia diagnosis, and accuses her husband, Charlie Fairhead (Derek Thompson), who is the clinical nurse manager, of "favouritism". Charlie is outraged and launches a "nasty outburst" towards Jade. Jade later learns that she will not receive her nursing registration unless she can obtain three references due to a criminal record. Staff nurse David Hide (Jason Durr) agrees to provide a reference and asks Charlie to do the same, but he refuses, having had another confrontation with Jade. However, to Jade's surprise, Dylan has given her "the best reference ever", having recognised Jade's talent as a nurse following their work on the maggot therapy trials. Meanwhile, David confronts Charlie in the staffroom for his behaviour towards Jade. Durr explained that David is "looking out" for Jade because he has "compassion and understanding", but unfortunately that "lands him in hot water". Jade later receives her nursing registration, and consequently was given a new costume which identifies her as a staff nurse.

=== Exploration of backstory ===
Producers decided to explore the character's backstory in a long-running story. Leon admitted that she had been encouraging the show's story team to create the story since her casting. She felt that the story showcased Jade in "a new light", which would prompt the audience to understand her better. On the story, Leon commented, "I think it's a very personal and pivotal story that anyone can relate to in terms of having difficult conversations with parental figures and overcoming huge obstacles." The actress felt the story would allow Jade to understand more about herself as well as her backstory. She dubbed the plot "a story of acceptance" which would make Jade realise how strong she is. Plans for the story were first teased by Raffety in May 2019, and her successor, Preece, explained that Jade would form "a new interest in her childhood". The show's seasonal trailer, released on 14 September 2019, previewed the beginning of the story. Leon would later call the story "one of my proudest achievements" on the serial.

The plot begins with the introduction of Nigel Armstrong (Stephen Casey), Jade's case worker during her time in foster care. Seeing Nigel forces Jade to consider whether she should question him about her childhood. After being encouraged by Marty and Robyn Miller (Amanda Henderson), Jade asks Nigel for details about her being placed in care, which he discloses. The show embargoed the details until broadcast, but teased that they would be "more painful than [Jade and Marty] could have anticipated". In the episode, Nigel reveals that Jade's mother was 22 years old when she gave her away, despite efforts from social services. This devastates Jade as she believed her mother gave her away as a struggling teenager. Jade then reads a letter from her mother. She decides against any further contact with her mother.

Writers then remove focus on the story for multiple months, before revisiting it with the introduction of Malc Denison (Connor Bryson), her former boyfriend. He was billed as "the one that got away", while Leon thought that Jade has "a soft spot for him" and would take him back in an instant. Leon explained that Jade is "pleasantly surprised" to see Malc again and his reappearance makes Jade consider a reunion for them. Seeing Malc prompts Jade to search for her mother. Leon thought it was a "big and terrifying decision to make". Malc is also deaf and the episode includes scenes only featuring British Sign Language (BSL), with subtitles on-screen for non-BSL speakers. Leon is not fluent in BSL. She worked with Bryson on developing the dialogue in the episode, so that they could "really hone in on[sic] how Jade and Malc communicate, and what their relationship is like through sign". Explaining their shared backstory, Leon stated that Malc was responsible for introducing her to deaf culture and the deaf community, having also taught her BSL. She noted that despite this, Jade did not feel she belonged in the deaf community due to her "perfect speech". The actress praised Casualty for its representation of BSL and hoped the language would feature in more scenes and other mediums of art.

==== "Jade's World" ====
Jade's story was the focus of a special episode of Casualty as she finally meets her mother. The episode marked the first in British history to be written and directed by deaf people and to feature a deaf cast. During the production process, the episode was coined "Jade's World". The concept of the episode stemmed from a suggestion from Leon, who wanted to explore "a day in the life of Jade" as well as the character's backstory. Charlie Swinbourne and Sophie Woolley co-wrote the episode and John Maidens directed the episode. Woolley thought there was "a big difference" in the production process by having more deaf creatives on the team. Leon, who stars in every scene of the episode, told producers that a deaf writer should be hired for the episode. A special camera lens was used in filming to ensure Jade was present in every scene. Sometimes, it was as close as 5 centimetres (2.0 in) away from her face, which Leon found challenging to not be distracted by. Preece devised the concept of the episode when she took over as series producer. Producers were keen for deaf people to tell this story, so Preece contacted Swinbourne and Woolley and discussed stories for Jade with them. They were then commissioned to co-write the episode, having met through the BBC Writersroom. Leon was pleased with their hiring and dubbed it "really satisfying and special" to work with fellow deaf creatives. She told Jesse Whittock of Broadcast Now that working with other deaf creatives boosted her confidence, commenting, "I'd never felt more myself." Swinbourne thought the hiring of deaf creatives to work on the episode was progressive and hoped it would spark others in the industry to hire deaf talents too.

Swinbourne and Woolley spent months working in collaboration with Leon and the show's story team to create the episode. Swinbourne told Michael Pickard of Drama Quarterly that he wanted to highlight how being deaf "shifts everything" and is not just about a lack of hearing or struggling to lipread. Leon told the Radio Times' Helen Daly that during the writing process, there was "a wonderful open dialogue [...] that always had Jade's experience of the world present at its forefront". They also worked closely with Maidens during the process; both Woolley and Leon praised his work as director. From the initial conception stage, Woolley wanted to showcase sound from Jade's point of view. She and Swinbourne spoke with Leon to learn what her experience of deafness was, including specific words that she may miss. Audio specialist Dr Lauren Ward worked with the writing duo on the audio in the episode. They then decided to make the audio a central part of the episode and worked with Maidens to achieve this. Through this, they challenged everyday problems that many deaf people face, including overstimulating noise and prejudice. Swinbourne aimed to "take the audience into a world they might not have experienced before". Leon felt that the use of audio turned "Jade's invisible disability into the visible".

"It is an insightful, heartfelt, authentic and raw view into Jade's world. The way the episode is filmed allows viewers to really be part of Jade's story, and what it's like living as her, disability and all, on this one particular day - probably one of the hardest days of her life."

—Leon on the special episode.

In a piece for the BBC Writersroom, the co-writers explained that the episode would challenge Jade into "dealing with her history, her sense of her self, and her deafness". Woolley wanted the audience to gain a better understanding of the character as well as to raise awareness of "the complexity of the different deaf experiences". Leon echoed this, commenting, "Our main goal was complete authenticity and a lovely, deeper understanding of Jade." Swinbourne was pleased that the episode was developed by deaf creatives and felt that their combined experiences inspired the story. Maidens wanted the episode to "pack a truly emotional punch" but for reasons that the audience could understand. Leon hoped the episode would remove the stigma of being deaf. She commented, "This episode is so special to me. It feels like a triumph.". Speaking to Sarah Ellis of Inside Soap, she dubbed the episode "a beautiful, personal story" that was "super-special". An accessible audio version of the episode was made available via the official Casualty website.

The episode follows Jade's day as she meets her biological mother Susie Ashby. Leon believed that placing a character with a disability at the centre of the plot was "a wonderful thing". Sophie Leigh Stone, a deaf actress, was cast as Susie. Leon called this meeting "one of the hardest days of Jade's life". Jade is surprised to meet Susie and learn she is also deaf. Leon told What to Watch's Elaine Reilly that the discovery creates "confusion, shock and even more unanswered questions" for Jade. She dubbed it "a pivotal, overwhelming moment" and added that it is a story about a woman meeting her biological mother rather than simply about her disability. The pair initially struggle to communicate, something that Swinbourne and Woolley storylined early in the planning process. Where Leon and Jade use hearing aids, Stone and Susie use BSL to communicate. Woolley hoped this would highlight the differences in deaf people and how they communicate. Swinbourne explained that they wanted to show how some simple forms of communication are taken for granted.

Jade's grandmother, Theresa Ashby (Jill Baker), was also introduced in the episode. Her appearance highlighted how deafness has impacted three generations of a family. Leon felt the episode did this well and was successful in highlighting prejudice towards deaf culture. When Susie is injured in an accident, Jade and Theresa accompany her to the hospital, where Jade supports her treatment. Leon noted that Susie and Theresa share "a very complicated relationship". It emerges that Theresa forced Susie to give Jade up for adoption, and now in the present day, an "overbearing" Theresa tries to keep the pair apart. Jade stands up to Theresa, which Leon called "a very cathartic moment". The episode concludes with Jade being warned away from Susie by Theresa, ruining the chance of any possible reconciliation. Despite this, Leon opined that her character "always wants to do the right thing and build on things she believes in", including a relationship with Susie. She added that it was "a beautiful thing to see and explore".

=== Attack ===
The character's next issue-led storyline occurs when she is spiked and attacked. Leon wanted the story to highlight drink-spiking as an issue and show that women are "not the problem". She also opined that the story brought to attention the additional barriers that people with disabilities face daily. The story was first previewed in a show trailer, released in March 2021. While clubbing with Faith Cadogan (Kirsty Mitchell), Jade removes her hearing aids. Leon explained that Jade finds the noise level "overwhelming", so removes them to feel "more comfortable". A man spikes Jade's drink, disorientating Jade. Leon told Inside Soap's Alice Penwill that Jade cannot what she is experiencing, which she thought was reflective of women's real life experiences.

When Faith is distracted, the man drags Jade into an alleyway, where she loses her hearing aid. Leon pointed out that Jade tries to save herself but is trapped and "very vulnerbale". As the man prepares to assault Jade, Faith finds and saves her. Although she is physically unharmed, Jade is "traumatised" by the attack. She is admitted to the ED and questions if she was attacked due to her disability. Leon explained that Jade believes that removing her hearing aids made her a target. She hoped the incident would just "become a bad memory" for her character and observed, "Jade goes on such a journey with herself." The actress found it challenging to film the story without being emotionally impacted, but was proud to raise awareness.

Writers developed the story as Jade decides that she wants revenge. After confiding in Marty and Robyn about the attack, she and Robyn go to a bar where they test drinks for spikings. Jade devises a plan to find a spiker, using Robyn as "bait". The plan works when a man, Avery Hicks (Ben Allen), spikes Robyn's drink and Jade manages to switch the drinks, causing Avery to become lifeless. While Jade wants to humiliate Avery, Robyn persuades her to call an ambulance. Writers wanted to showcase that the attack did not need to "define" Jade.

=== Departure ===
Leon decided to leave Casualty after three years on the show to seek other opportunities in her career. Her departure was announced on 13 September 2021, and Jade departs in the series 36 episode "The Road Less Travelled", first broadcast on 18 September 2021. The actress felt proud of her achievements whilst on the drama, namingly becoming the first regular character with a disability and increasing representation of deaf people on mainstream television. She found leaving the character "really emotional" and admitted that the character would "always be very special" to her. Leon told Alice Penwill from Inside Soap that in addition to missing the cast, she would miss Jade's humour. She also confirmed that the character could return in the future.

Working towards the character's departure, writers created a story for Jade which explores her reasons for joining the nursing profession. Leon dubbed this "Jade's origin story". The story begins with a flashback to 2016 in a feature-length episode which celebrates the thirty-sixth anniversary of Casualty. Leon was delighted to be included in the show's anniversary celebrations and enjoyed playing Jade in a different period of her life. In the flashback, Jade has just commenced her nursing training and feels unsure of herself. Leon explained that Jade feels "quite lost as an individual". Jade is then involved in a car accident with her then-boyfriend Toby Damron, portrayed by Alex Zur. In real life, Leon and Zur are in a relationship and the actress enjoyed working with him. The accident seriously injures Emma Nash (Jaimi Barbakoff). Her actions subsequently save Emma's life, prompting her to continue her training. Leon pointed out that this is "a huge turning point for Jade", which pushes her through her training.

Emma's sister, Stevie Nash (Elinor Lawless), is then introduced to the series as a new ED consultant. Her introduction story sees her seek revenge for Emma's injuries and although she targets Ethan Hardy (George Rainsford), Jade is also drawn into the story. Leon opined that there is "so much to unpack with Stevie and Jade", which would be explored in the series. Jade looks up to Stevie and rates her as a doctor. Leon explained that Stevie praises Jade's work as a nurse, so Jade begins to trust Stevie. However, Stevie soon learns the truth about Jade's involvement in Emma's accident and decides to take revenge. Leon pointed out that Jade is unaware that Stevie is plotting against her, despite the fact her actions could be damaging for Jade's career.

The character was given the main focus in her final episode as her stories are concluded. As part of this, Stone reprised her role as Jade's mother, Susie, who is admitted to the ED. This marks the first time Jade has seen her mother since their reconciliation. Leon was pleased that Stone could be part of her final episode. Jade is involved in a verbal altercation with Mrs Coles, the leader of a group Susie was attending. Leon thought the character of Mrs Coles was "a huge catalyst" for Jade deciding to leave. Writers also incorporated Jade into other character's stories during her final episode. Leon thought this made the episode "extra special" and that the writing of these scenes "really captures Jade’s heart". The actress enjoyed filming these scenes.

As part of her revenge plan, Stevie frames Jade by planting drugs in her locker. Leon called this a "devastating moment" for Jade and said that Jade feels betrayed by her colleagues. She commented, "Ultimately, Jade does not feel safe at Holby City anymore". Jade is suspended from work pending investigation. She feels unsupported by her friends, with the exception of Marty. Leon told Reilly (What to Watch) that Jade feels "not valued and appreciated enough", which is then exaggerated by the day's events. Jade does not suspect Stevie has framed her, which Leon accredited to Stevie's "endearing praise and apparent friendship". She thought that Jade would be "deeply embarrassed and hurt" if she learnt the truth.

Jade struggles knowing that one of her colleagues has framed her, so she decides to quit her job. Leon called her character "stoic and strong" and said that she knows she should be better treated. She explained that Jade recognises her skill set would be better utilised on a personal passion. Leon told Dainty (Digital Spy) that she loved Jade's "willingness to put herself first, for maybe the first time in her life". Jade shares an "emotional" conversation with Susie where they agree to start again. They then leave the ED together. Leon opined that Jade finishes on "a strong end note".

== Reception ==
For her portrayal of Jade, Leon was nominated for Best Soap Newcomer at the 2018 Digital Spy Reader Awards. In 2021, she was nominated for Soap Actor of the Year at the TRIC Awards. At the 2021 British Academy Television Awards, Casualty won the accolade for Best Soap and Continuing Drama. One episode submitted to the awarding body as part of the nomination was "Jade's World". The show also won the accolade for Best Soap at the Broadcast Awards in 2022, partly for the "Jade's World" episode. The episode was also nominated for a Rose d'Or award at the 2021 award ceremony. In 2022, the show was nominated in the Best Soap and Continuing Drama category at the Royal Television Society Programme Awards, accredited in part to the focus on Jade and her disability.

Dainty (Digital Spy) called Jade "loveable but slightly lackadaisical", while Radio Times critic Alison Graham labelled Jade "dopey", "the answer to Louise's nursing crisis" and "perfect" for the ED because she "offers unwanted, unwarranted and presumptuous advice". Elaine Reilly from What to Watch dubbed Jade an "argumentative junior nurse". Ellis (Inside Soap) thought Jade arrived as "a surly student nurse" but had become "proficient" at her job. In 2020, Reilly wrote that since her debut, "the junior nurse has defied the odds to become one of the team's most valuable and compassionate members, as well as a favourite with Casualty fans." Haasler (Metro) described Jade as "a bit of a handful", "careless, work-shy and with attitude to spare", but "actually quite competent". She later dubbed Jade "feckless", but actually "deeply caring and sweet". Haasler likened the character to Holby City character Donna Jackson (Jaye Jacobs) in her early tenure and thought Jade has "that Casualty quality of being able to sort out the patients' personal lives as well as their illnesses", which would establish her as well-suited to the ED. She looked forward to exploring the character further and hoped that her characterisation would not change as she liked it. Additionally, Haasler liked that Jade's deafness had not "been made into a huge deal".

Leon received a positive response about her character from the deaf and hearing-impaired community. She liked that she could provide media representation to an underrepresented community. She also received praise for the character's backstory - how Jade grew from "a difficult, troubled upbringing" to become a successful nurse - which delighted Leon, who believed it inspired more young people to enter nursing. She found it "satisfying" when viewers supported Jade fighting for injustice and hoped that it inspired others to stand up themselves. On the show's portrayal of disability, the reviewer commented, "it's been so good to see a character whose disability sometimes impacts the way she's able to do her job (such as when she had to wear full PPE and struggled to communicate), but in a way that presents this as a problem of society rather than the disabled person herself."

Upon joining the cast of Casualty, actress Jacey Salles (Rosa Cadenas) praised the character of Jade, calling her "really interesting". What's on TV's Anna Francis labelled Jade's introduction "memorable" and "slightly rocky" and looked forward to watching her. She stated that the character "proved a hit" with the audience and "win [them] over" with Jade's backstory praised by viewers. Brown (Radio Times) disliked Jade and Dylan's maggot therapy plot, calling it "gross", and was disappointed when it was revived. Charlotte Tutton of the Daily Mirror observed that viewers were "repulsed" over the maggot scenes and found themselves "put off watching the show". Haasler (Metro) liked the pairing of Jade and Dylan, calling them "amusing", and branding them "Team Maggot". Dainty expressed her interest in the character and said that she was "keen to learn more" about her. Haasler thought that Jade telling Marty about her numerous rejections from foster families was "a sad reflection of her upbringing". Shaun Linden from ATV Today named the episode featuring Jade meeting Nigel one of their television highlights of the day.

The pairing of Marty and Jade received a mixed response. Haasler liked it and opined that it "works brilliantly" due to their contrasting characterisations. She later said that they made "an excellent double act" and thought they worked as light relief in an otherwise "bleak" episode. She added that Jade's decision to lock Marty in a cupboard "ended predictably badly", and was critical about writers placing them at odds as she disliked their "annoying squabbling". Graham (Radio Times) called Jade and Marty the "two very annoying new nurses", and thought they were examples of "abysmal" discipline towards the ED's staff. She criticised Jade for being "lazy, stupid and insubordinate" and dubbed her and Marty "halfwits". Her colleague, David Brown, liked the "sweet" pairing of Jade and Marty and wanted to see it further explored. Haasler was surprised by Jade's belief that Marty would beat her to the nursing bursary as she felt Jade had been "proving week after week what a good nurse she is", adding that the "famously hard-to-impress" Dylan was impressed with her. Rebecca Miller of the Daily Express called Marty and Jade a "fan-favourite duo". Haasler did not expect Jade's decision to pretend to be Marty's girlfriend to go well. Dainty (Digital Spy) dubbed Marty and Jade "friendship goals".

Jade's special episode drew much positive praise from television critics and viewers alike. It was dubbed "effective and dramatic" by Haasler, who thought the reunion between Jade and Susie was "very moving" and "emotional". Dainty believed the episode offered "a personal and authentic insight into what it's like being a deaf nurse in a busy ED". She praised the authentic and organic nature of the plot and how it explored the character through her personal and professional life. The reviewer also commended Leon's acting, opining that she provided "one of the performances of her career". She also thought Leon's performance was informed by the lack of representation in mainstream television. The episode was described as "groundbreaking" by Tasha Hegarty (Digital Spy) and Ahmed Khalifa from deaf awareness publication Hear Me Out!. Hegarty also observed that viewers thought the episode was "clever" and "incredible".

In a review of the episode, Khalifa praised the realism of Jade's experience with hearing aids, but criticised some of the episode's captioning. He thought the story with Jade and Susie was "emotional" and "really deep". Discussing Jade's backstory and the realism of it, Khalifa opined that it was "heartbreaking" and "just perfectly done". One particular moment from the episode that he praised was a line from Jade: "it is OK to be deaf"; he felt this was an important line as it brought much representation onscreen. He concluded that the episode was well-produced and great representation for the deaf community. Maidens received a positive response from the viewers and others across the globe. UK charities also reached out in support of the episode.

Joe Anderton from Digital Spy observed that viewers found Leon's portrayal of her character's spiking "powerful". Haasler found the scenes of Jade's attack "scary and suspenseful". Reilly included Stevie discovering Jade's involvement in Emma's accident as one of the television highlights of the day. She also included Jade's final episode in the television highlights, calling the episode "Another tender trip to Holby ED." Haasler described the character's exit as "bittersweet". She felt the scene where Susie defends Jade in sign language was "beautifully moving".
