= Olivia D'Lima =

English actress (born 1993)

- Born: Olivia Marie D'Lima; 10 June 1993 (age 33); Enfield, London, England
- Years active: 2017–present

Olivia Marie D'Lima (born 10 June 1993) is an English actress and writer. For her role in the BBC One medical soap opera Casualty (2020–2022), she was nominated for Best Newcomer at the National Television Awards. She has since appeared as a regular in the Paramount+ series The Killing Kind (2023) and multiple shows across Netflix, ITV and BBC. More recently, she stars in the feature film 100 Nights of Hero, playing the sister of Charli xcx.

== Early life ==
D'Lima was born in the North London Borough of Enfield and grew up near Southgate. She is of Goan and English descent; her mother is from North Yorkshire, and her father was born in Kenya and grew up in Bombay. She was a student at The Latymer School between 2004 and 2011. Before going into acting, D'Lima worked as a Learning Support Assistant (LSA) at Cuffley School.

== Career ==
In 2020, D'Lima joined the cast of the BBC One medical soap opera Casualty as the paramedic Fenisha Khatri, a role she would play until the character's death in 2021. For her performance, she was nominated for Best Newcomer at the 26th National Television Awards. She would also reprise her role in a 2022 flashback of the character's love interest.

D'Lima made guest appearances in episodes of the BBC One crime drama Death in Paradise and the ITV series Van der Valk in 2022 and 2023 respectively. She wrote the short films A Normal Night and Beige, and the web series Naughties. She had a main role as Suzanne in the Paramount+ legal drama The Killing Kind.

She stars in the BFI London Film Festival 2025 Closing Film, 100 Nights of Hero as the sister of Charli xcx.

== Personal life ==
D'Lima is based in south Hertfordshire, England. She is hypermobile.

== Filmography ==
=== Film ===
Year	Title	Role	Notes
2017	Disconnect	Alice	Short films
2018	Alison	Alison 5	Short films
2018	Driver's Seat	Cherry	Short films
2019	Storytellers	Chloe	Short films
2019	Mosquito	Anna	Short films
2019	Sensational Simmy!	Kay	Short films
2022	A Normal Night	Lucy	Short film; Also director, writer & producer
2022	Beige	Chloe	Short film; Also writer
2023	Mr. Mimoto	—N/a	Short film; Producer only
2025	Scallywags	Pao	Short film; Also writer & producer
2025	100 Nights of Hero	Caterina	
2025	Safe	Jennifer	Short films
2025	There Will Come Soft Rains	Mira	Short films
2026	Ebenezer	Maggie	
2026	Tell Your Face	Chikana	Short film; Also writer & producer

=== Television ===
Year	Title	Role	Notes
2018	Plastic Paddies	Emily	Television film
2019	Twisted Guide to Life	Boss	Web series; 7 episodes
2020	HASH#	Daffers	Television film
2020–2022	Casualty	Fenisha Khatri	37 episodes
2021	The National Television Awards 2021	Herself	Television special
2022	Death in Paradise	Ayana Jelani	Season 11, Episode 5
2022	The Stand Up Sketch Show	Various	2 episodes
2022	Small Doses	Emma James Khan	Television pilot
2023	Chai with Rai	Herself	Podcast; Episode: "Body Hair Is OK"
2023	Van der Valk	Katya Alsteen	Episode: "Magic in Amsterdam"
2023	The Killing Kind	Suzanne	6 episodes
2023	Naughties	Olivia	Web series; 7 episodes; Also director, writer & producer
2025	Too Much	Alex the AD	Episode: "Enough, Actually"
2026	Dulux: Life Is What You Paint It	Lily	Television advertisement
2026	Beige	Chloe	Adapted from the short film; Also director, writer & producer

== Awards and nominations ==
Year	Award	Category	Work	Result	Ref.
2021	National Television Awards	Best Newcomer	Casualty	Nominated	
2021	Independent Shorts Awards	Best Actress	A Normal Night	Won	
2021	Independent Shorts Awards	Best First Time Director (Female)	A Normal Night	Honourable Mention	
