= CasualtyXHolby =

Crossover of British medical dramas Casualty and Holby City

- Casualty and Holby City crossover event

Part 1: Casualty
- Episode title: "Episode 26"
- Episode no.: Season 33; Episode 26
- Directed by: Steve Brett
- Written by: Michelle Lipton
- Original air date: 2 March 2019

Episode chronology
| ← Previous "Episode 26" | Next → "Episode 27" |
- Casualty series 33

Part 2: Holby City
- Episode title: "Powerless"
- Episode no.: Season 21; Episode 10
- Directed by: Steve Brett
- Written by: Michelle Lipton
- Original air date: 5 March 2019

Episode chronology
| ← Previous "Guts" | Next → "A Simple Lie – Part One" |
- Holby City series 21

Crossover chronology
- Preceded by: Deny Thy Father: Part Two

"CasualtyXHolby" is a two-part crossover of the British medical dramas Casualty and Holby City. The first part aired on 2 March 2019, and the second on 5 March 2019 on BBC One. Both episodes were written by Michelle Lipton and directed by Steve Brett. The plot sees Holby City Hospital experience a loss of power due to a cyberattack. Consultants Connie Beauchamp (Amanda Mealing) and Jac Naylor (Rosie Marcel) also come into conflict when they learn there is only one theatre available while treating two of their colleagues.

The episodes mark the first time that the two shows have crossed over since 2005, and are part of a year-long celebration for Holby City's 20th anniversary. The crossover was first pitched to BBC One in 2017 and early drafts had various vehicles striking an electrical substation to cause the blackout, before the teams settled on a cyberattack. The crossover allows characters from both shows to interact with one another, as they react to the cyberattack and the effect it has on the hospital. It also shows how reliant the hospital is on technology.

"CasualtyXHolby" was filmed in late 2018 at the Roath Lock studios and BBC Elstree Centre. Crew from both shows worked together across the two sets. Harper found organising the filming schedule to be the hardest part of creating the episodes. The production design team created two sets especially for scenes in which Ric Griffin (Hugh Quarshie) has to crawl through the hospital's ventilation system.

The crossover was promoted with a series of trailers and cast member appearances on talk shows. "CasualtyXHolby" received a positive response from television critics. Victoria Wilson of TVTimes stated that it was "a gripping crossover with a fitting ending", while Sue Haasler for the Metro thought the cyberattack was a good plot device, which led to a "toe-curlingly good" clash between Connie and Jac. The crossover was nominated for Best Drama Storyline at the 2019 Inside Soap Awards.

== Plot ==
=== Part 1 ===
In the Holby City Hospital resus department, the monitors begin showing patients going into ventricular fibrillation, confusing Jade Lovall (Gabriella Leon), Dylan Keogh (William Beck) and Charlie Fairhead (Derek Thompson), who find the patients are all stable. The computers are also affected, preventing the staff from accessing patient records. Elle Gardner (Jaye Griffiths) calls Ric Griffin (Hugh Quarshie) on AAU, who tells her they also have problems with the computers. Ric, Connie Beauchamp (Amanda Mealing), Jac Naylor (Rosie Marcel), Adrian "Fletch" Fletcher (Alex Walkinshaw) and Serena Campbell (Catherine Russell) are summoned to a board meeting with CEO Henrik Hanssen (Guy Henry), who tells them that the network has been infected with a virus, caused by a member of staff opening a spam email. Connie, Jac and Serena then inform the rest of the staff that they will have to take manual observations.

Paramedic Ruby Spark (Maddy Hill) becomes suspicious about her colleague Iain Dean (Michael Stevenson), after finding his uniform in his locker, but no other personal effects. Ruby goes to Iain's home, where she finds him unresponsive and brings him to the ED. Meanwhile, Sacha Levy (Bob Barrett) meets Ric's granddaughter Darla Johnstone (Naomi Katiyo) in a pharmacy and offers her a ride to school, before he and his daughter Beka (Francessa Barrett) go shopping. Sacha and Beka argue when a pregnancy test falls out of her bag, causing him to lose focus and crash. Sacha and Darla free themselves, but Beka is trapped. Elle is sent to the scene and she reduces Beka's dislocated shoulder. Ruby tells Connie that she believes Iain tried to end his life, which his sister Gemma Dean (Rebecca Ryan) refuses to believe.

Connie initially treats Iain's symptoms as a heart attack, leading Ruby to return to Iain's house, where she finds three empty pill bottles in his neighbour's bin. Connie accepts them as evidence of an overdose. She and Hanssen later discuss moving patients to other hospitals when the fire alarm goes off. Dylan takes Beka to AAU with Marty Kirkby (Shaheen Jafargholi), where they reduce her open femur fracture. Elle takes Darla to Serena's office and comforts her when she blames herself for the crash. After discovering that Iain has a pericardial effusion, Connie attempts to take him to the trauma theatre, however, upon finding the locks are compromised, Connie calls Jac to ask if the theatre on Darwin is free. She and David Hide (Jason Durr) meet Fletch in the lift, which comes to a sudden stop. The lights then go out throughout the hospital, prompting the emergency lighting system to activate.

=== Part 2 ===
Hanssen informs the staff of AAU that the hospital will be evacuated. On ITU, Dominic Copeland (David Ames) tells Ange Godard (Dawn Steele) that Serena is on her way up to discuss moving Ange's patient, Holly Cartwright (Emma Curtis). In the lift, Connie realises that Iain is running out of oxygen and his sats are falling. David tells her that Gem had the Ambu bag, so Connie takes Iain off the ventilator and breathes for him. Jac charges Zosia March (Camilla Arfwedson) with coordinating Darwin's patient evacuation and goes to find Connie. Sacha tells Ric about the crash and why it happened. They argue about their families and Jac intervenes. Sacha accuses Jac of taking sides and he collapses in the locker room as she leaves. Gem, Marty, and Rash Masum (Neet Mohan) open the lift doors and get everyone out. Elsewhere, Beka and Essie Harrison (Kaye Wragg) are trapped in a radiology scanner room, while Elle and Darla learn that Darla is pregnant. Hanssen tries to get Iain moved to a nearby hospital, but Jac and Connie convince him that surgery will be quick.

Ric finds Sacha and Jac diagnoses an aortic transection. She takes him to the theatre, where she argues with Connie about who should take priority. Jac states that she should decide as she is lead consultant for cardiothoracics, however, Connie counters that she is lead consultant for the ED. Jac points out that she has not been a surgeon for nine years. Jac starts Sacha's surgery in the theatre, and Connie operates on Iain in the anaesthetic bay. Serena struggles to get Holly into another hospital, but eventually finds one in Aberdeen. In radiology, Essie discovers some of Beka's stitches have come out, but she collapses due to hypoglycemia. Xavier "Zav" Duval (Marcus Griffiths) and Donna Jackson (Jaye Jacobs) assist Jac, while Connie discovers Iain has a torn vessel and needs to open him up. Receptionist Noel Garcia (Tony Marshall) finds Beka and Essie in radiology. Darla tells Ric that she is pregnant and he reacts badly. Elle calms him down and they discuss their recent one-night stand.

Zav's stitches are not holding, so Jac convinces Connie to help by telling her she is the best CT surgeon Holby ever had. Ric crawls through the ventilation duct to get into the scanner room, where he gives Essie glucose. Iain goes into VF as Zav finds a tear in the right ventricle. He struggles and Jac takes over, saving Iain. Connie finishes up just at the bypass battery runs out. Connie calls Jac a terrible person, and says that she was Holby's greatest CT surgeon, but now Jac is. The power returns to the hospital and Noel hands his notice in to Hanssen, believing himself to be at fault for opening a spam email saying he had been nominated for an award. Hanssen reveals the virus originated at St James' and migrated to the Holby network, and that the email was genuine, as he himself nominated Noel for his years of service to the hospital. Fletch signs Essie off sick for a week. Serena tells Ric to be there for Darla. Gem sits with Iain, and Beka visits Sacha. As Hanssen and Serena leave the hospital, Hanssen refers to the state of things as Tuesday.

== Production ==
=== Conception and writing ===
On 15 February 2019, the BBC confirmed that Casualty and Holby City would crossover for a two-part special. It marks the first time since 2005 that the two shows have crossed over, although characters have periodically crossed over usually for a single episode. The episodes were also part of a year-long celebration for Holby City's 20th anniversary. Executive producer Simon Harper described "CasualtyXHolby" as "pure, nail-biting, taut, emotional medical drama". He also acknowledged that fans had been demanding a crossover event, saying "We've known for some time there's been major audience appetite for a mega crossover between these sister shows." Both episodes were written by Michelle Lipton and directed by Steve Brett. It features characters from both series, who interact with one another when their storylines intertwine. The crossover adheres to "the house style" of both dramas, with the first episode following the format of Casualty and set mainly in the Emergency Department, and the second following Holby City's format. The plot centres on Holby City Hospital which experiences a cyberattack, cutting power to the lights and medical equipment.

In a blog for BBC Online, Harper explained that the Holby City team first pitched the idea of the crossover to BBC One in 2017, followed by a second, more detailed pitch in the spring of 2018. He admitted that the planning for the episode was "a huge challenge with regard to many factors – finding the right story, scheduling, finding appropriate big serial points in both shows at which to intersect, the sheer logistics of it all." He also explained that the crew of Casualty plot storylines far in advance of Holby City, whose team did not know where the show would be at the time of the crossover. The episodes needed "the right catastrophic event scenario" that would bring the characters together, and also cause the blackout. Harper said early drafts had various vehicles striking an electrical substation, which would cause the blackout, but after discussing the idea in an emergency meeting, the teams chose a cyberattack. Harper praised Lipton for handling the change and replanning the storyline.

Actress Catherine Russell told Laura-Jayne Tyler of Inside Soap that the storyline shows viewers how reliant the hospital is on technology. Things like observations and pulse checks have to be done manually, which the older characters are shown to be comfortable with, but the younger staff members are not. In addition to the lack of technology, the hospital also suffers with low theatre spaces, so patients have to be prioritised before surgery is carried out under battery-powered lights. Russell's colleague Hugh Quarshie, who plays Ric Griffin, commented, "they have to make difficult and quick decisions under pressure..."

=== Cast and characters ===
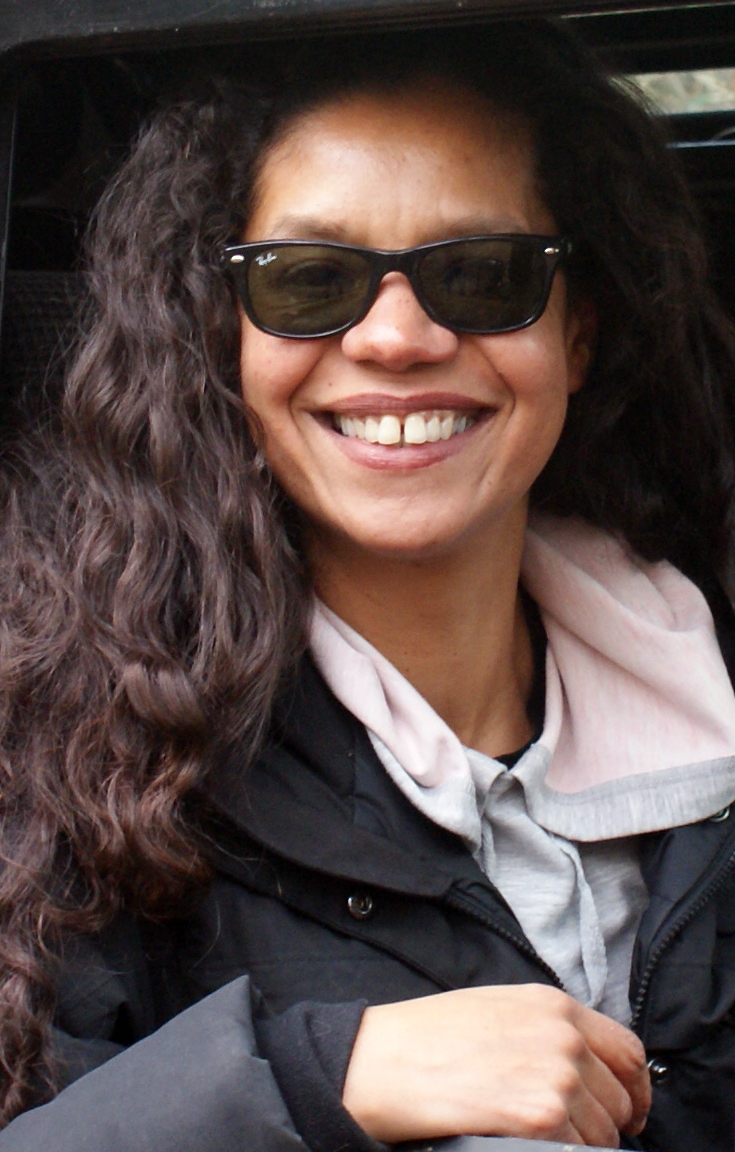
Viewers learn that Casualty character Elle Gardener, played by Jaye Griffiths (pictured), was involved in a crossover romance with Holby City character Ric Griffin, played by Hugh Quarshie.

The crossover allows characters from both shows to interact with one another, as they react to the cyberattack and the effect it has on the hospital. Harper pointed out in his blog that viewers assume that all the staff know each other and have worked together off-screen, so when they see these interactions it is "entirely organic and yet jolting and exciting when you see it on screen!" A predominant story in the episodes follows consultants Connie Beauchamp and Jac Naylor coming into conflict, as they attempt to save the lives of two of their colleagues after separate incidents. With only one theatre available, Connie and Jac are forced to decide who takes priority. Harper picked out the Connie/Jac storyline as a favourite, saying "It's always delicious to see Connie and Jac together, it's scalpels at dawn when those two meet, with their shared history and rivalry from when Connie, now a Casualty character, was in Holby. She used to be Jac's boss – now they are competing alphas and Jac doesn't let her forget it!" Mealing told Tyler (Inside Soap) that viewers would get the response they wanted – a clash between "two very strong women" during the episodes.

The first episode features the attempted suicide of paramedic Iain Dean (Michael Stevenson), whose depression storyline had spanned 47 episodes of Casualty. While Iain is rushed to the ED to be treated by Connie, Holby City consultant Sacha Levy (Bob Barrett), his daughter Beka (Francesca Barrett) and Ric Griffin's granddaughter, Darla (Naomi Katiyo) are involved in a car crash, after Sacha is distracted by a pregnancy testing kit that falls out of Beka's bag. Beka suffers a broken leg, leading to the paramedic team and doctors from Casualty to treat her. Barrett said that Sacha actually has the more life-threatening injury, but he does not realise it and later collapses with a blood clot. In the second episode, Connie and Jac attempt to save both Iain and Sacha with only one operating theatre available. Barrett explained that he had to pretend to be unconscious for around 15 scenes, as Mealing and Marcel argued above him. Stevenson enjoyed having "a ringside seat" as Connie and Jac battled it out.

Elsewhere, Ric has to crawl through the hospital's ventilation ducts with a medical kit to help Beka and Essie Di Lucca (Kaye Wragg) in the radiology department. Quarshie likened the scenes to something out of Die Hard, saying "It wasn't quite Bruce Willis, but it was challenging – and I have some scars to prove it!" Quarshie also pointed out that there are several references to his character's age in the script, and he thought that it implied that even at his age, he could still be an action hero. Ric is also involved in a crossover romance, as viewers learn that Ric had a brief relationship with doctor Elle Gardner (Jaye Griffiths). The plot development was previously mentioned in an episode of Casualty, with Elle describing a sexual encounter she had in a lift at a conference. Quarshie admitted that he did not know anything about the storyline, until the crossover.

=== Filming ===
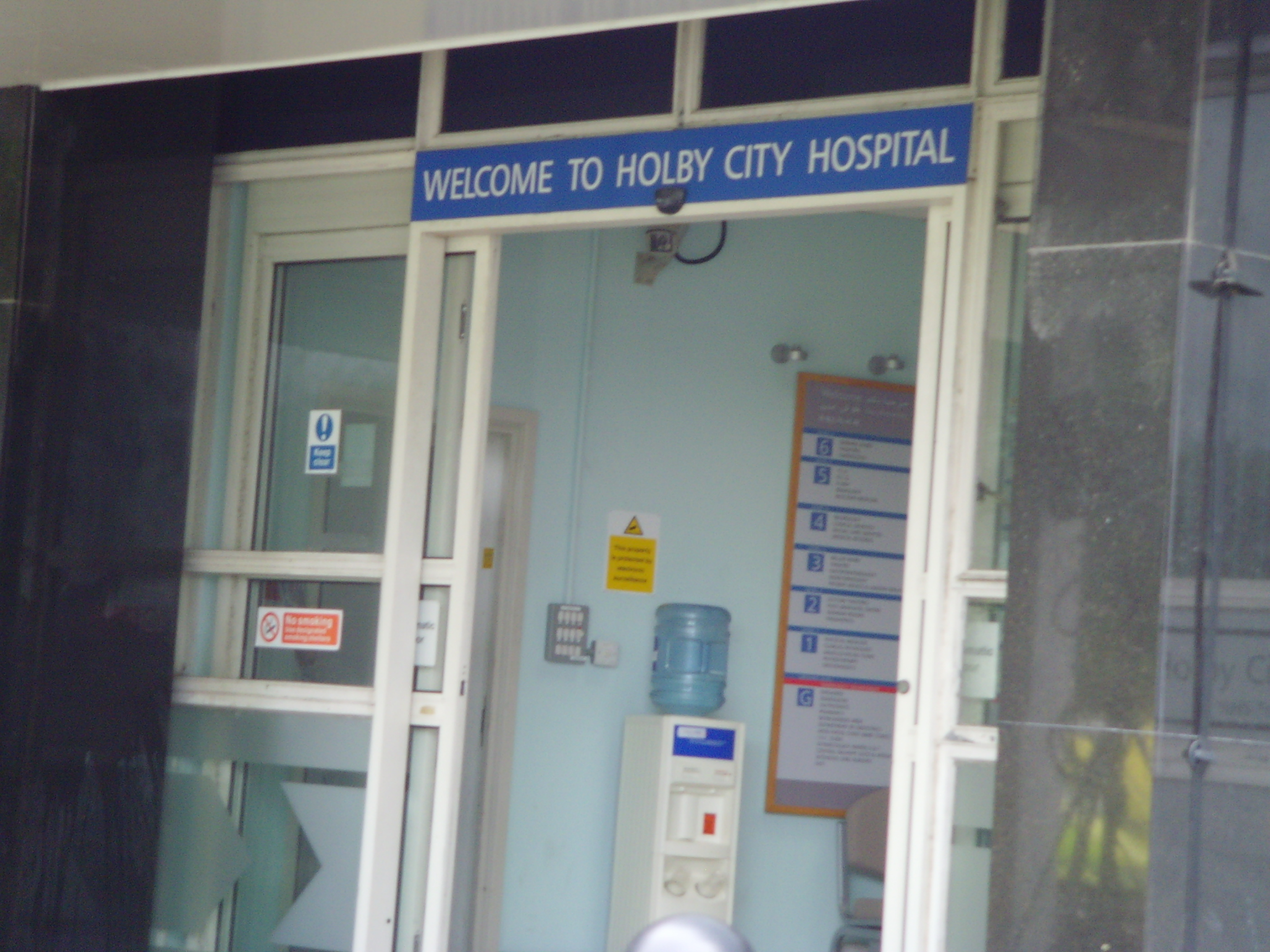
The crossover was filmed on the Holby City set in Elstree (pictured) and Roath Lock studios in Cardiff.

Both episodes were filmed in November 2018, at the Roath Lock studios in Cardiff and BBC Elstree Centre. Sophie Dainty of Digital Spy confirmed that crew from both shows worked together across the two sets to create the episodes. Harper praised the crew for "making the mind boggling logistics work, quite aside from their creative wizardry." In his BBC blog, Harper said that organising the filming schedule was the hardest part of the crossover, as special episodes are often filmed on top of the regular filming schedule for both shows. He also revealed that the episode featuring Iain's suicide attempt overlapped with the crossover.

The production design team created two sets especially for the scenes in which Ric Griffin (Quarshie) crawls through the ventilation ducts to get to the scanner room. Designer said that the scanner room set has no ceiling space above it, so the team started off looking at existing sets to adapt and utilise, before deciding to build a ducting set in a separate area. The set had to have enough room underneath for the filming crew, while being able to support the actor's weight as he crawled around on top.

The second set was a suspended ceiling, which was able to hold the actor and filming crew. A store room layout was created underneath to provide a camera angle showing Ric punching through a ceiling tile and realising he is in the wrong location. A scaffolding company was brought in to help the construction team with both sets. Because there is no space above the scanner room set, Quarshie jumped off a box into the shot, while cutaways were used to show his character seemingly jumping down from the ceiling to the floor of the room.

Barrett admitted that he had wanted to film a crossover since he joined Holby City. He spent two weeks in Cardiff filming his scenes and he was amazed at how the team put the car crash stunt together, as Holby City does not often film large stunts. Mealing wanted to do more crossovers on the same scale, but realised that it would be difficult because of the scheduling of both shows. She said, "Holby City and Casualty's filmed transition times are slightly different so it's really difficult to arrange the two schedules together, so I understand why it doesn't happen!"

== Promotion and broadcast ==
The episodes were promoted via a series of trailers. The BBC released the first trailer, titled "This Is An Emergency", on 15 February. The 40-second clip shows scenes of the blackout, the car crash and scenes between Jac and Connie. A second trailer, "Help is Coming" was released on 21 February, and a third on 24 February 2019. This was followed by a short behind-the-scenes feature on the BBC's Casualty website. Towards the end of February, cast members Bob Barrett and Cathy Shipton (Duffy) appeared on Steve Wright in the Afternoon on BBC Radio 2 to promote the episodes, while Shaheen Jafargholi (Marty) and Rosie Marcel were guests on the ITV breakfast show Lorraine.

The first half of the crossover was broadcast on 2 March 2019, and the second part aired on 5 March 2019.

== Reception ==
The first episode was watched by 5.94 million viewers, making it the 8th most-watched television show on BBC One for the week of 25 February – 3 March 2019. The second episode was seen by 5.02 million viewers and came in 10th place for the following week.

The episodes were nominated for Best Drama Storyline at the 2019 Inside Soap Awards under the title of "The Holby cyber-attack". Reporters for the Daily Mirror included the Casualty half of the crossover in their "Hot On The Box; What Not to Miss out on This Week" list. A Sunday Mirror reporter chose the second episode as part of their "TV Choice" feature, commenting "Nope you're not hallucinating, that really is the cast of Casualty infiltrating your Tuesday night dose of medical drama."

Elaine Reilly of TVTimes gave the Casualty half of the crossover five stars and chose it as her "Pick of the Day". She called it "a clever crowdpleaser and must-see TV, whether you're a devoted Casualty fan, exclusively into Holby City or like to dip into both." Reilly's colleague Victoria Wilson also praised the crossover during her five star review of the concluding episode. She said the drama "moves up a gear" and it was "a gripping crossover with a fitting ending."

The Metro's Sue Haasler also had a positive reaction to the crossover and how well everything was integrated. She wrote: "Both casts worked so well together and the script and direction made everything seem natural and like this is how it is every week. It really did feel like all one hospital (though you have to wonder whether they'll all go their separate ways at pub time)." Haasler found the cyberattack to be "a very clever idea", while the clash between Connie and Jac was "toe-curlingly good." Although Haasler felt Ric's ventilation crawl and Essie's collapse was a stretch, she thought it was done well, as was the battle to save both Iain and Sacha. She concluded, "Although the story stood by itself and could be enjoyed by viewers of either or both shows (or even neither, as it was so dramatic on its own), it has nudged both shows' storylines on a bit."

Sophie Dainty of Digital Spy stated "It came, it delivered, and now it's all over. Holby City and Casualty fans have been treated to two unmissable crossover episodes as the sister shows joined forces for a shocking cyber-attack story." Like Haasler, Dainty said the crossover had raised several questions and advanced storylines. Writing for the Radio Times, David Brown thought the cyberattack plot was not original, as several US medical dramas had recently covered the subject, but he found that "where Casualty succeeds is in its focus on beloved series regulars rather than the technicalities of the IT failures."
