= Casualty series 33 =

Thirty-third series of Casualty

Casualty
- Series 33
- Starring: William Beck; Di Botcher; Jason Durr; Jaye Griffiths; Chelsea Halfpenny; Amanda Henderson; Maddy Hill; Shaheen Jafargholi; Gabriella Leon; Genesis Lynea; Tony Marshall; Amanda Mealing; Neet Mohan; Jack Nolan; Azuka Oforka; George Rainsford; Rebecca Ryan; Charlotte Salt; Michael Stevenson; Cathy Shipton; Derek Thompson; Charles Venn
- No. of episodes: 46

Release
- Original network: BBC One; BBC One HD
- Original release: 11 August 2018 – 10 August 2019

Series chronology
- ← Previous; Series 32 Next → Series 34

The thirty-third series of the British medical drama television series Casualty commenced airing in the United Kingdom on BBC One on 11 August 2018, one week after the end of the previous series and finished on 10 August 2019. The series consisted of 46 episodes. Lucy Raffety continued her role as series producer, while Simon Harper continued his role as the show's executive producer.

Sixteen regular cast members reprised their roles from the previous series. The series, which was billed as "The Year of the Paramedic", begins with a motorway collision stunt sequence, and features a crossover episode with spin-off series, Holby City. This series featured the departures of six cast members, including Amanda Mealing as Connie Beauchamp, Azuka Oforka as Louise Tyler and Chelsea Halfpenny as Alicia Munroe. Four new regular cast members also joined the series, while two actors began appearing in a recurring capacity.

== Production ==
The thirty-third series will consist of 47 episodes. Lucy Raffety continues her role as series producer while Simon Harper remains as the executive producer. Kate Oates became the show's senior executive producer from October 2018, and was promoted to Head of Continuing Drama six months later. Raffety's resignation from her position was announced on 16 April 2019. Raffety confirmed that there would be a series 33 in an interview with TVTimes, where she billed the series as the "Year of the Paramedic". In preparation for the series, two new paramedic characters were introduced to the drama.

It was announced on 24 July 2018 that the series would begin on 11 August 2018 with an episode described as "one of [the] biggest episodes in the show's history." It was previously revealed, in May 2018, that the show was filming scenes which would feature a motorway crash and a petrol tanker turning on its side. Sophie Dainty of entertainment website Digital Spy reported that there would be an explosion, which would leave one main character's life "hanging in the balance". An official statement from the show stated that the ED's paramedic crew would "face their darkest day" in the episode. Charlotte Salt, who portrays Sam Nicholls, told Elaine Reilly of What's on TV that the episodes were filmed at night over two weeks with night shoots lasting over 13 hours. On the atmosphere on-set while filming, she commented, "there's a certain buzz in the air..." The episode sees Sam die after suffering a fatal bleed from the crash, which sparks a new story for Iain as he struggles to cope with his grief. A show trailer, released on 12 August, teased "a new era" for the hospital following Sam's death. The trailer previewed Iain's guilt, the appearances of Zsa Zsa and Omo, Eddie facing trial for Alicia's rape, and upsetting scenes for Charlie and Duffy. On 16 November 2018, it was revealed via Casualty's official Instagram page that the show would be receiving a new set of titles. The revamp came into effect from episode 13, which aired on 17 November 2018, replacing the show's former titles, which were introduced back in series 31.

=== Crossovers ===
This series features crossover events with Holby City's sister show Casualty. In August 2018, Raffety told Dainty (Digital Spy) that Harper enjoys the crossover events between the two dramas and wanted to produce more. She also teased some "extremely exciting crossovers" within the series. In a December 2018 interview with Dainty, Harper promised further crossovers between Holby City and Casualty, and teased an "exciting" event to be aired in spring 2019. Holby City cast member Alex Walkinshaw (Adrian "Fletch" Fletcher), who appeared in Casualty between 2012 and 2014, makes a crossover appearance in episode 31.

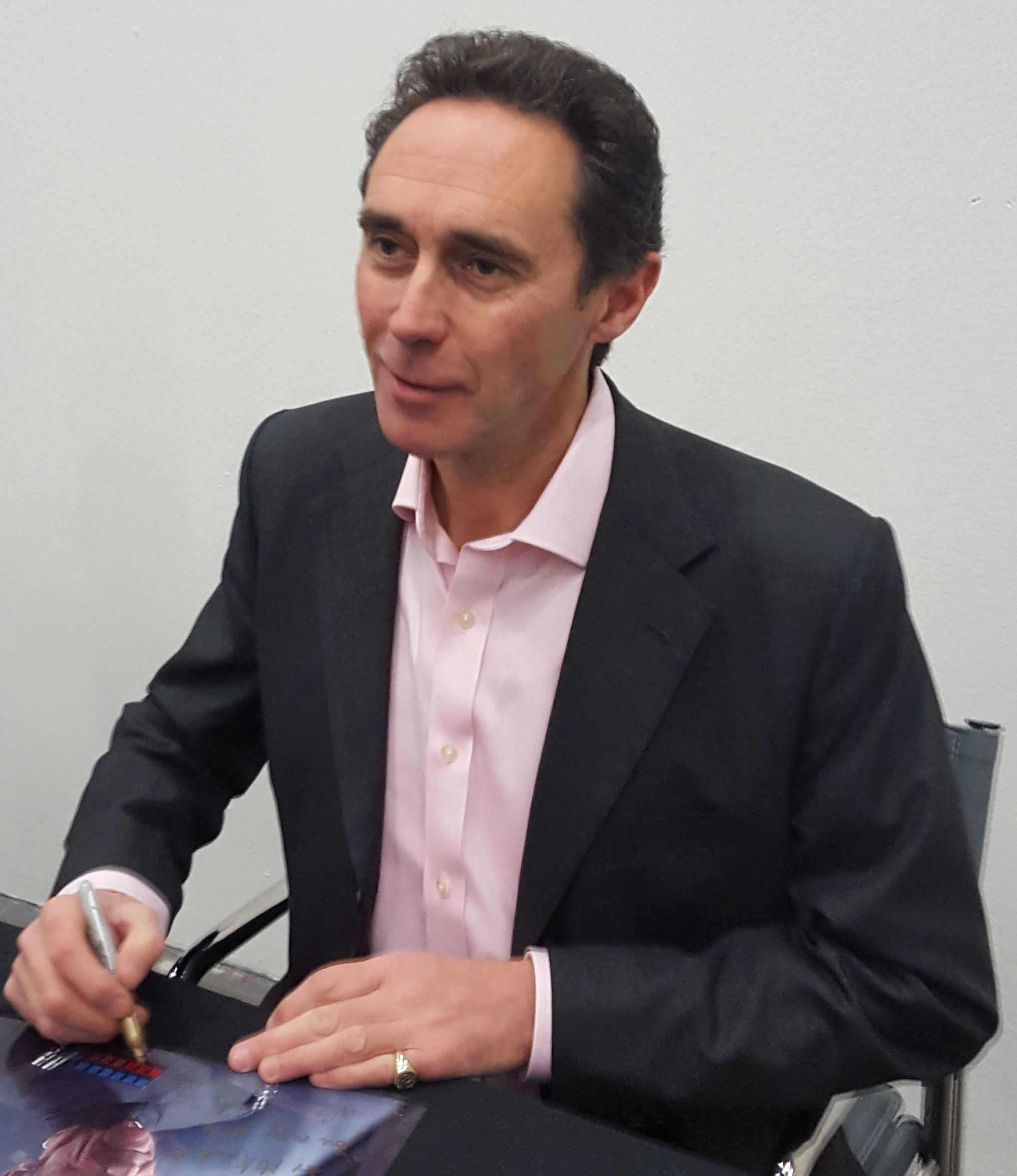
Holby City actor Guy Henry appears as Henrik Hanssen in the crossover event, and then again in the series finale.

On 15 February 2019, it was announced that Casualty would crossover with spin-off series Holby City for two episodes, billed as "CasualtyXHolby", in March as part of the year-long twentieth anniversary celebrations for Holby City. The episodes are billed as "dramatic [and] action-packed". Both episodes were written by Michelle Lipton and directed by Steve Brett. The episodes see the hospital attacked by a cyber-virus, destroying all electric systems. A predominant story in the episodes follows Connie and Holby City character Jac Naylor (Rosie Marcel) saving the lives of colleagues after two separate major incidents, despite only having one available theatre. Harper described the episode as "pure, nail-biting, taut, emotional medical drama". He also praised the production teams of both shows for their logical creation of the episodes, and looked forward to exploring the interactions between the characters from the two shows.

Nine Casualty cast members – Mealing (Connie Beauchamp), Durr (David Hide), Stevenson (Iain Dean), Ryan (Gem Dean), Mohan (Rash Masum), Jafargholi (Marty Kirkby), Griffiths (Elle Gardner), Marshall (Noel Garcia), and Hill (Ruby Spark) – feature in the Holby City episode of the crossover, originally broadcast on 5 March 2019. The Casualty episode of the crossover, episode 26 of this series, features the Casualty cast alongside twelve Holby City cast members – Marcel (Jac Naylor), Bob Barrett (Sacha Levy), Hugh Quarshie (Ric Griffin), Guy Henry (Henrik Hanssen), Catherine Russell (Serena Campbell), Alex Walkinshaw (Adrian "Fletch" Fletcher), Kaye Wragg (Essie Di Lucca), Jaye Jacobs (Donna Jackson), Marcus Griffiths (Xavier "Xav" Duval), Nic Jackman (Cameron Dunn), Camilla Arfwedson (Zosia Self), and Belinda Owusu (Nicky McKendrick) – and two Holby City guest actors – Francesca Barrett as Beka Levy and Naomi Katiyo as Darla Johnstone.

== Cast ==
=== Overview ===
The thirty-third series of Casualty features a cast of characters working in the emergency department of Holby City Hospital. The majority of the cast from the previous series continue to appear in this series. Amanda Mealing appears as clinical lead and consultant in emergency medicine and cardiothoracic surgeon Connie Beauchamp, while William Beck, George Rainsford and Jaye Griffiths portray consultants Dylan Keogh, Ethan Hardy, and Elle Gardner respectively. Chelsea Halfpenny portrays specialty registrar Alicia Munroe, who later specialises in pediatric emergency medicine. Neet Mohan appears as F1 doctor Rash Masum, while Derek Thompson stars as Charlie Fairhead, the clinical nurse manager, senior charge nurse and emergency nurse practitioner. Cathy Shipton appears as Lisa "Duffy" Duffin, a sister and midwife. Charles Venn portrays senior staff nurse Jacob Masters, while Azuka Oforka features as staff nurse Louise Tyler, who is later promoted to senior staff nurse. Amanda Henderson and Jason Durr play staff nurses Robyn Miller and David Hide. Charlotte Salt, Michael Stevenson and Maddy Hill portray paramedics Sam Nicholls, Iain Dean, and Ruby Spark respectively. Tony Marshall stars as receptionist Noel Garcia. Additionally, four cast members feature on the series in a recurring capacity: Rebecca Ryan features as porter Gemma Dean; Kai Thorne portrays Blake Gardner; Joe Gaminara appears as F1 doctor Eddie McAllister; and Di Botcher plays operational duty manager and paramedic Jan Jenning.

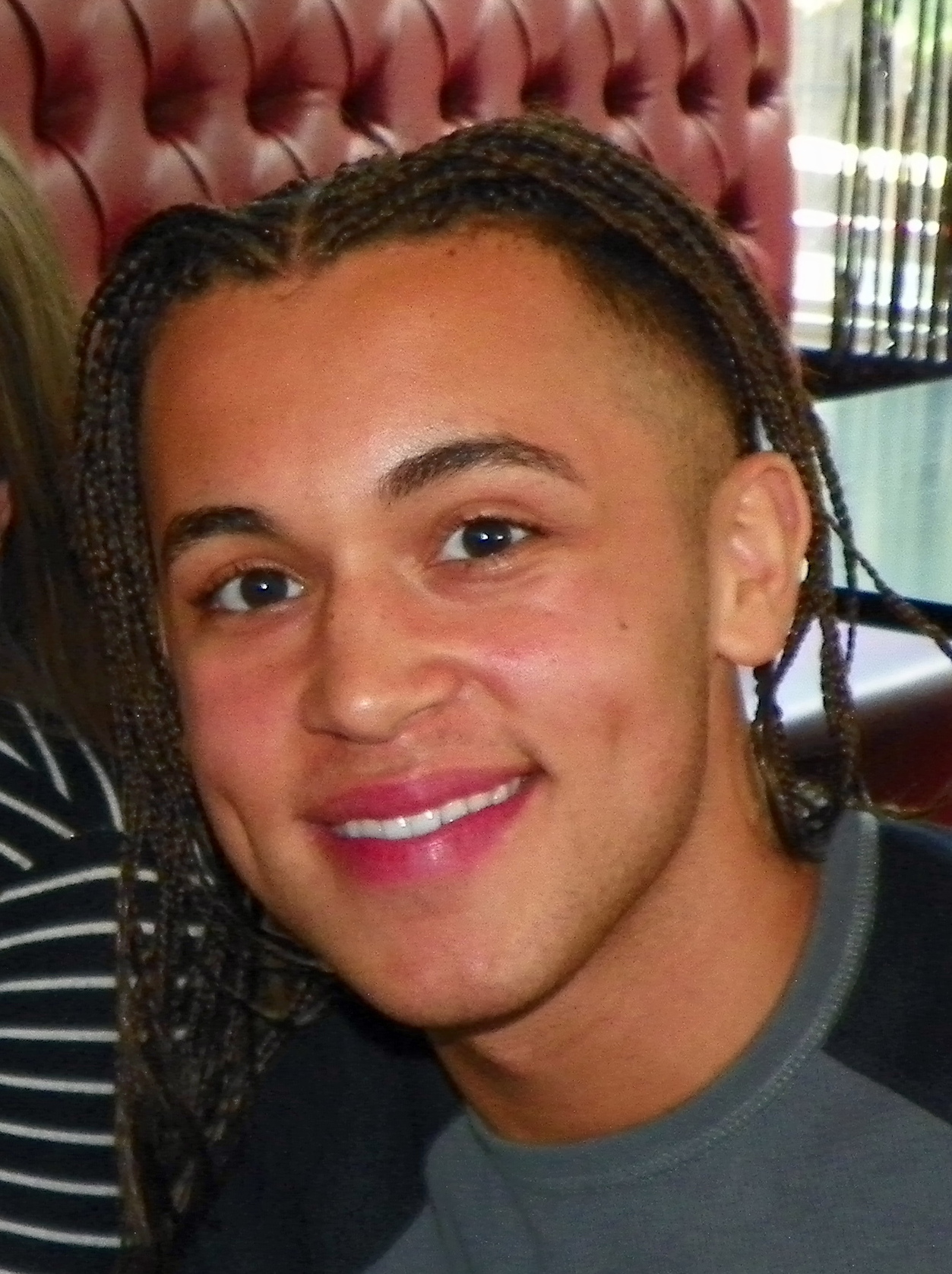
Shaheen Jafargholi joined the cast as student nurse Marty Kirkby in episode 13.

In the opening episode of the series, Sam is killed off after succumbing to injuries sustained in a motorway collision. Salt, who had returned during the previous series, decided to leave again, but was shocked to discover her character would die. She was glad that her departure was kept hidden and felt it had a greater impact. Gaminara makes his last appearance in episode 3 after pleading guilty to attacking Alicia. Halfpenny opted to leave her role as Alicia in 2018 after deciding to pursue other roles. Alicia departs in episode 20. Oforka also chose to leave her role as Louise, having appeared in the show since series 26. The character's exit was not announced beforehand and Louise leaves in episode 24 after an ongoing financial struggle. Oforka thanked fans for their support on social network Twitter and expressed her delight at working on the drama. Griffiths' exit from the series was announced on 4 May 2019; her character left in episode 36. Mohan took a four-month break from the series in 2019 and his character departed in episode 32 after deciding to travel the globe. Rash returns during the following series. Mealing's break from the show was announced on 15 April 2019 after the actress finished filming days earlier. A show spokesperson confirmed that Connie would return in the "autumn", during the following series. Connie departs in the season finale at the conclusion of her story about posttraumatic stress disorder and drug addiction.

On 1 August 2018, Sophie Dainty of Digital Spy reported that former EastEnders actor Shaheen Jafargholi had joined the cast as new nurse, Marty Kirkby. Series producer Lucy Raffety revealed on 15 August 2018 that actress Gabriella Leon would join the show alongside Jafargholi, playing student nurse Jade Lovall. Jade first appears in episode 12, originally broadcast on 3 November 2018, while Marty first appears in episode 13, originally broadcast on 17 November 2018. Raffety also announced plans to introduce new doctors during this series. Genesis Lynea and Jack Nolan were later cast as registrars Archie Hudson and Will Noble. Archie is characterised as "bold, bolshy and extremely confident", while Will is billed as unfazed by Archie's personality. Department troubleshooter Ciaran Coulson (Rick Warden) is introduced in episode 37 as part of the semi-regular cast. He is created as an unlikeable character and rival to Connie, who tries to improve the ED after they fail to meet targets. Raffety announced on 31 May 2019 that Jacey Sallés would join the cast as porter Rosa Cadenas during the series and feature in an "interesting story" with David. Rosa first appears in episode 44.

The series features several recurring characters and multiple guest stars. It was announced on 21 June 2018 that actress Sharon Gless would reprise her guest role as neurosurgeon Zsa Zsa Harper-Jenkinson in the series. Zsa Zsa appears in episode 9. In August, it was confirmed that Ellen Thomas would be playing Jacob's mother Omo Masters from September 2018. Thomas appears in episodes 6 and 8 respectively. In February 2019, it was confirmed that Thomas had reprised the role for another stint exploring Jacob's backstory, and she appears between episode 36 and 41, where the character was killed off. Episode one features the first appearance of Max Parker as Alasdair "Base" Newman, a drug addict who Iain befriends. Parker reappears from episode five as part of the recurring cast, and departs in episode 22 when his character is killed off. Base's drug dealer, Ross West (Chris Gordon), also appears in the series across five episodes between episode 5 and episode 22. In his final episode, Ross is revealed to be Jan's son. The same storyline also sees the reappearance of DC Kate Wilkinson (Amy Noble) in episode 22, a character who has appeared on-off since series 30.

Belinda Stewart-Wilson rejoins the recurring cast as Ciara Cassidy, Dylan's alcoholic friend, in episode 2, following her appearance in the previous series. Gyuri Sarossy is later introduced as Ciara's husband, Joel Dunns, in episode 5. Both characters depart in episode 14. Accredited actor Clive Wood makes his first appearance as Duffy's "childhood sweetheart", Bill Crowthers, in episode 3. Dainty confirmed that Wood would feature prominently in Duffy's new storyline. Bill's daughter, Rachael Crowthers (Jennifer Hulman), was later introduced, appearing in episodes 7 and 16. Rash's childhood friend, Jamila Vani (Sujaya Dasgupta), appears between episode 7 and episode 11. Dylan's father, Brian Carroll (Matthew Marsh), appears in episode 9, having last featured in series 30. Gareth David-Lloyd appears as Jade's boss, Joshua Bowers, in episode 12. The character, billed as a "dishy doctor", returns from episode 15 as a love interest for Marty, but leaves in episode 20. Actor Paul Barber joined the recurring cast in episode 13 as Ernest Maxwell, a homeless man involved in a storyline with Louise. The character is killed-off in episode 23 as the storyline continues, emotionally impacting Louise. Sian Reeves reprised her role as Kim Harrison, the mother of Iain and Gem, in episode 24 and 27. Georgia Hughes joined the recurring cast as Dani Mallison in episode 27 and features in a storyline with Ruby. Harry Gilby also joined the recurring cast as Toby Williams in episode 29 and features in an ongoing story with Will. Towards the end of the series, Marty's parents, Bibi Kirkby (Badria Timimi) and Graham Kirkby (Philip Wright), were introduced as part of a story exploring Marty coming out.

=== Main characters ===
- William Beck as Dylan Keogh
- Jason Durr as David Hide
- Jaye Griffiths as Elle Gardner (until episode 36)
- Chelsea Halfpenny as Alicia Munroe (until episode 20)
- Amanda Henderson as Robyn Miller
- Maddy Hill as Ruby Spark
- Shaheen Jafargholi as Marty Kirkby (from episode 13)
- Gabriella Leon as Jade Lovall (from episode 12)
- Genesis Lynea as Archie Hudson (from episode 28)
- Tony Marshall as Noel Garcia
- Amanda Mealing as Connie Beauchamp (until episode 46)
- Neet Mohan as Rash Masum (until episode 32)
- Jack Nolan as Will Noble (from episode 29)
- Azuka Oforka as Louise Tyler (until episode 24)
- George Rainsford as Ethan Hardy
- Rebecca Ryan as Gemma Dean (until episode 46)
- Charlotte Salt as Sam Nicholls (until episode 2)
- Cathy Shipton as Lisa "Duffy" Duffin
- Michael Stevenson as Iain Dean
- Derek Thompson as Charlie Fairhead
- Charles Venn as Jacob Masters

=== Recurring characters ===
- Paul Barber as Ernest Maxwell
- Di Botcher as Jan Jenning
- Gareth David-Lloyd as Joshua Bowers
- Joe Gaminara as Eddie McAllister
- Harry Gilby as Toby Williams
- Chris Gordon as Ross West
- Georgia Hughes as Dani Mallison
- Max Parker as Alasdair "Base" Newman
- Rebecca Ryan as Gemma Dean (until episode 46)
- Jacey Sallés as Rosa Cadenas (from episode 44)
- Gyuri Sarossy as Joel Dunns
- Belinda Stewart-Wilson as Ciara Cassidy
- Kai Thorne as Blake Gardner
- Rick Warden as Ciaran Coulson
- Clive Wood as Bill Crowthers

=== Guest characters ===
- Camilla Arfwedson as Zosia Self
- Bob Barrett as Sacha Levy
- Francesca Barrett as Beka Levy
- Sujaya Dasgupta as Jamila Vani
- Sharon Gless as Zsa Zsa Harper-Jenkinson
- Marcus Griffiths as Xavier Duval
- Guy Henry as Henrik Hanssen
- Jennifer Hulman as Rachael Crowthers
- Nic Jackman as Cameron Dunn
- Jaye Jacobs as Donna Jackson
- Naomi Katiyo as Darla Johnstone
- Rosie Marcel as Jac Naylor
- Matthew Marsh as Brian Carroll
- Amy Noble as DCI Wilkinson
- Belinda Owusu as Nicky McKendrick
- Hugh Quarshie as Ric Griffin
- Sian Reeves as Kim Harrison
- Catherine Russell as Serena Campbell
- Rebecca Scroggs as Frankie Arnolds
- Ty Tennant as Aaron McKiernan
- Ellen Thomas as Omo Masters
- Badria Timimi as Bibi Kirkby
- Alex Walkinshaw as Adrian "Fletch" Fletcher
- Kaye Wragg as Essie Di Lucca
- Philip Wright as Graham Kirkby

== Episodes ==
| No. overall | No. in series | Episode | Directed by | Written by | Original release date | UK viewers (millions) |
|---|---|---|---|---|---|---|
| 1094 | 1 | Episode 1 | Steve Brett | Simon Norman | 11 August 2018 | 5.83 |
Iain and Ruby visit Mia, a frequent caller claiming to have overdosed. Iain learns Mia has not taken anything, so leaves with Ruby. The pair are sent to Alicia's house, where they find she has a serious arm injury from being pushed through a window by Eddie. On their way to the hospital, Mia jumps from a bridge causing Iain to swerve and crash. A tanker carrying butane avoids hitting the ambulance, but causes a pile-up on the dual carriageway. Ruby and Alicia are trapped in the ambulance, where Ruby resets Alicia's dislocated elbow. Iain helps treat patients at the scene, while Ruby is sent to the hospital with Mia after being freed from the ambulance. Sam, Jan and Dylan help treat the injured. The tanker explodes just as they get the last remaining casualty out of her car; the force of the explosion causes Sam to slam into the ambulance window. Mia dies and Iain blames himself. At the ambulance station, Sam realises her liver has been nicked by shrapnel and she tries to treat herself. Iain finds Sam and she loses consciousness. He attempts CPR, but Sam dies.
| 1095 | 2 | Episode 2 | Steve Brett | Patrick Homes | 18 August 2018 | 5.30 |
Iain tells Jan that he had the potential to save Mia's life, ultimately preventing the crash and Sam's death. Jan questions Iain over why there was no record of his and Ruby's attendance to Mia's house, before telling him to alter his statement in order to save his career. Iain is wracked with guilt and decides he cannot lie. He hands his statement in, and is suspended by Jan. Dylan is surprised by the return of Ciara, the woman he met at his alcoholics anonymous meeting. Ciara's alcoholic friend is admitted to the ED after going cold turkey, resulting in a dangerous shock to her body system. Dylan learns that Ciara is also struggling with her own alcoholism. Connie raises her concerns with the senior staff of the hospital that targets are not being met.
| 1096 | 3 | Episode 3 | Thomas Hescott | Marissa Lestrade & Steve Bailie | 25 August 2018 | 5.37 |
Alicia returns to work earlier than planned and treats a family of five who have been involved in a car crash. She connects with the children in the family as she treats their mother and sister, who is in need of a transplant. Alicia decides she wants to specialise in paediatrics, and informs Connie of her decision. She also goes to courtroom to hear how Eddie pleads to his rape charge; Eddie pleads guilty and Alicia is relieved. Dylan is tasked with clearing out Sam's locker. He brings Jacob along with him and they clean her locker out together. Following his shift, Dylan visits Ciara at her house; the pair share a kiss and Dylan is invited inside. Rash's parents have gone on holiday, giving him the opportunity to invite Gem round for the night. Their evening together is quickly halted however, when his parents abruptly return home after getting the dates wrong on the booking website.
| 1097 | 4 | Episode 4 | Thomas Hescott | Jeff Povey | 1 September 2018 | 5.23 |
Iain makes a speech at Sam's funeral, but Dylan interrupts and publicly blames Iain for Sam's death. Iain decides he has had enough of Holby, and vows to miss his tribunal hearing and leave for good. When Iain sees Dylan at the hospital, he confronts Dylan and punches him. Jan calms Iain down and helps him see sense, while Dylan later tells Iain he is a good paramedic, encouraging him to attend his hearing. Iain's job is saved, but he continues to hold a grudge against Ruby. Alicia and Ethan treat a young boy and his mother injured by a motorbike. They find unusual bruising on the young boy and work together to uncover what is going on. Jacob and Blake bond as they share fond memories of Sam.
| 1098 | 5 | Episode 5 | Judith Dine | Jerome Bucchan-Nelson & Dana Fainaru | 15 September 2018 | 5.12 |
Dylan grows concerned for Ciara when she fails to answer any of his calls and goes missing. Ciara later turns up at the ED after getting drunk, and is found in a cubicle by David, who hides her from Dylan. Dylan soon finds Ciara and learns what David has been up to; he berates David for his actions. Dylan later goes to visit Ciara back at her house, but receives a shock when Ciara's husband opens the door and introduces himself. Iain returns to work following his tribunal hearing, and decides to work alone to get away from Ruby. He finds a homeless Base in a carpark, who has gotten himself into trouble with drug dealers in the aftermath of Mia's death in Episode 1093. Iain takes Base back to his house and vows to help him get his life back on track. Ethan visits Alicia at her house and repaints her bedroom to help her overcome her recent rape ordeal.
| 1099 | 6 | Episode 6 | Judith Dine | Chris Murray | 22 September 2018 | 6.00 |
Dylan tries to avoid Ciara when she arrives at the ED with her husband Joel complaining of abdominal pains, but he later decides to investigate. Dylan learns that Ciara is pregnant, that he is father, and that she has an ectopic pregnancy. Dylan supports Ciara, but she rejects him, so he heads over to the pub and gets drunk. Blake is inspired to look for his grandmother after hearing an anecdote from Jacob about her. He finds Omo running a local church shop, and introduces himself. Elle warns Blake to be careful around Jacob, as she believes Jacob's relationship with Omo is strained. Iain secures Base a place on the rehabilitation course, but as the pair head to the rehabilitation centre in the ambulance, Iain leaves Base alone to get him something from the shop. When Iain returns to the ambulance, Base has run away, and taken a bag of drugs with him.
| 1100 | 7 | Episode 7 | Alex Jacob | Jon Sen | 29 September 2018 | 5.46 |
Ruby and Iain are placed on another shift together. They attend a hoax call from schoolkids to a block of flats, annoying Iain. They are then called to a car crash involving a pregnant patient. Ruby successfully delivers the baby and Iain apologises to Ruby for being so abrupt towards her. Duffy walks out of a doctors appointment and is given medication. As she arrives at the ED, she tries to talk to Charlie, but is unable to. She instead confides in Bill Crowthers, a former lover of hers, about how she has been diagnosed with anxiety disorder. Louise is promoted to band six nursing following a successful interview. Gem and Ruby both secure rooms in Alicia's flat.
| 1101 | 8 | Episode 8 | Alex Jacob | Rachel Paterson | 6 October 2018 | 5.97 |
Jacob is shocked when the police escort Omo to the ED after she has auditory hallucinations whilst on the bus with Blake. Jacob tells Blake that Omo has schizophrenia, and that he left home when he was younger as a result of it. Elle treats Omo, but as she does, her auditory hallucinations worsen, so she is sedated, leaving Jacob heartbroken. Iain's aggression continues to expose itself as he punches an ambulance window when a drug overdosed patient dies in a park. However, later in their shift, they save a man and his son from crashing their car after the man falls asleep at the wheel. Ruby praises Iain for his actions. Gem and Rash plan to spend the night together, but when Rash is sick after seeing Gem begin to undress, she gets upset and ends their relationship.
| 1102 | 9 | Episode 9 | Jordan Hogg | Dana Fainaru | 13 October 2018 | 5.92 |
Dylan awakes in his boathouse, drunk. David grows concerned for Dylan when he does not answer any of his calls and has not been seen in a while, so he calls for back-up in his search for Dylan, by bringing Zsa-Zsa back over from the USA to help him. Dylan's father, Brian, arrives at the boathouse and takes Dylan out to a pub. There, Brian tells Dylan he wants to make it up to him and that he has been sober for over one-hundred days. Dylan is unconvinced by Brian's speech and makes him drink alcohol to prove he loves him. Brian then becomes drunk, which leads to a confrontation between the pair when Dylan phones Brian's girlfriend to say he is drinking alcohol again, resulting in her leaving him. Dylan pushes Brian causing him to hit his head on a bench. Brian then fits, forcing Zsa-Zsa to perform emergency surgery on him to save his life. She then takes Dylan back to the hospital, where she plans to take him back to the USA with her, but David dissuades her from doing this. Rash reels from his break-up with Gem. His friend, Jamila, tries to cheer him up by offering to take him to a medics ball with her, to which he accepts.
| 1103 | 10 | Episode 10 | Jordan Hogg | Oliver Frampton | 20 October 2018 | 5.74 |
Dylan is unamused when Ciara is admitted to the ED again after waking up on the floor surrounded by broken glass. There, Ciara apologises to Dylan for the awkward tensions she has created between them. As Ciara is discharged, she collapses, and admits that it may be the result of her liver. Charlie asks Duffy to work another shift as the nursing team becomes understaffed, despite Duffy having recently worked a night shift. She makes an almost fatal error with a patient which Charlie spots, prompting him to tell her to go. Duffy heads to the pub where she is greeted by Bill, who offers to listen to her troubles. Louise's first day as senior nurse does not go to plan as the Care Quality Commission carry out an inspection following recent poor standards.
| 1104 | 11 | Episode 11 | James Bryce | Jason Sutton | 27 October 2018 | 6.07 |
Iain and Ruby receive a call-out to a warehouse which has been set alight following an explosion. There, Iain finds Base again, who has been working in a meth lab to pay off his debts. Iain confronts Base at the ED and makes him see the extent of the damage caused. After his shift, Iain struggles with his mental health, as events continue to play on his mind. Duffy wakes up in a hotel room with Bill and is horrified as the realisation that she has cheated on Charlie sinks in. When she meets with Charlie again, Charlie comforts her. Alicia and Ethan plot to reunite Rash and Gem at the medics ball by having Gem attend the ball instead of Alicia. Rash realises he is still in love with Gem, and the pair kiss, as a jealous Jamila watches on.
| 1105 | 12 | Episode 12 | James Bryce | Rob Gittins | 3 November 2018 | 5.73 |
Louise heads up to the maternity ward of the ED to continue to professionally develop following her promotion. Whilst there, Louise is unimpressed by the sluggishness of student nurse Jade Lovall, who arrives late to her shift before going to sleep on one of the ward beds. Louise works alongside Jade in the hopes to improve her attitude to work. Jade impresses Louise during their shift together, so Louise tells Jade she will ask Charlie if she can join the ED as a nurse. Charlie remains doubtful of Duffy, whose defensiveness over her phone arouses his suspicions. Iain tells Ruby that he is feeling better following the events of the previous week. Once alone, he phones the wellbeing team to seek help over his mental health troubles.
| 1106 | 13 | Episode 13 | Julie Edwards | Dana Fainaru | 17 November 2018 | 5.38 |
Dylan is horrified when he hears Ciara being beaten by Joel over the phone. Dylan requests for an ambulance and the police to attend Ciara and Joel's house, where the two are admitted to the hospital. Robyn finds bruising on Ciara's back and raises her concerns with Connie, who brings a domestic abuse advisor into the hospital to talk to Ciara. Dylan gets frustrated by the time taken to get Ciara away from Joel, so he decides to flee with her, but Joel catches Dylan and Ciara together in the car, and starts to chase them, but soon crashes into a parked car. As Ciara and Dylan look back to see what has happened, a van collides with Dylan's four-wheel drive. New student nurse Marty Kirkby joins the ED and pleases Louise when he correctly suspects a patient of having meningitis. Duffy panics when she catches Charlie answering her phone.
| 1107 | 14 | Episode 14 | Julie Edwards | Steve Bailie | 24 November 2018 | 5.10 |
Dylan regains consciousness following the crash and begins to look after injured patients. Ciara tries to convince Dylan to flee the scene of the crash with her, but Dylan refuses to. Ciara runs back to her house to pack some belongings, including her passport, before heading over to Dylan's boathouse with her dog. After treatment at the hospital, Dylan returns to his boathouse and Ciara tells him she is leaving the country. She asks him to look after her dog until she has settled down, where he can then move in with her and they can begin their life together. Jade and Marty treat a patient who they both fancy, and decide to see who can get the patient's number first. Jade's determination to win leads her to locking Marty in a store cupboard, where he has an asthma attack, and is later found unconscious by Jade. Louise expresses her disappointment in Jade's actions.
| 1108 | 15 | Episode 15 | Eric Styles | Dana Fainaru | 1 December 2018 | 5.05 |
Iain and Ruby treat a teenager who has fallen over whilst running to catch a school bus. Once they have transferred the patient over to the ED, Alicia unearths a more serious underlying problem which is troubling the teenager, and with the teenager's parents constantly arguing, Iain finds himself on the roof of the hospital trying to talk the teenager down. After their shift, Iain and Ruby go out drinking together, where Iain misreads Ruby's signals and kisses her. Duffy is admitted after falling over at home, and when she forgets what happened in the lead up to her fall, she types her symptoms into a diagnostic tool, and self-diagnoses herself with dementia. Marty pretends that Charlotte is his daughter to try and get himself a date with consultant Joshua, who he meets outside the hospital.
| 1109 | 16 | Episode 16 | Eric Styles | Katie Douglas | 8 December 2018 | N/A (<4.72) (Note: Not reported in the weekly top 15 programmes for four-screen viewer ratings.) |
Charlie is left speechless when Bill, who is admitted after collapsing, reveals to Charlie that he and Duffy have been seeing each other again, unaware that Charlie is Duffy's husband. Duffy is heartbroken upon realising Charlie knows, and attempts to put things right between them, but is unsuccessful. She also attempts to tell Charlie of her recent memory loss, but is unable to. Alicia learns to trust her instincts when she expresses welfare concerns towards a teenager who is admitted after an accident whilst stealing from a shop. Marty arranges a date with Joshua following encouragement from Jade. Iain takes the day off of work following his awkward attempt to kiss Ruby. Elle stands in as clinical lead while Connie visits Grace.
| 1110 | 17 | Episode 17 | Paul Riordan | Oliver Frampton | 22 December 2018 | 4.38 |
On Christmas Eve, Dylan is called back to help in resus, and chooses to stay longer. When David suggests he's overworking due to Ciara leaving, he insists that he drops the subject. He later asks David to read a card from Ciara. Gem becomes suspicious of an agency nurse; it is later revealed that they work in a local hospice and stole a rapid infuser from the hospital. Rash tells Gem that he wants to spend Christmas with her, rather than his family.
| 1111 | 18 | Episode 18 | Matthew Evans | Katie Douglas | 5 January 2019 | N/A (<5.63) |
Iain gets into a fight with a man called Gregor, and receives treatment in the ED. Louise catches Jade and Marty reading a magazine while on a shift, and after having disagreements all day, Jade answers an advert for a spare room in a shared house, which turns out to be where Marty lives.
| 1112 | 19 | Episode 19 | Matthew Evans | Julie Dixon | 12 January 2019 | 5.25 |
Alicia treats a pregnant woman who is worried about her immigration status, and after giving birth, the woman takes her baby with her due to thinking she will be charged with treatment. When the baby becomes cyanosed, they are rushed back into the ED. Ethan opposes Alicia's suggestion of an umbilical catheterisation, but she goes ahead with successful results. Duffy books a memory test with her GP, and is upset when she struggles with it.
| 1113 | 20 | Episode 20 | Paul Riordan | Rebecca Wojciechowski | 19 January 2019 | 5.22 |
Alicia receives a letter from the City of Manchester hospital offering her a paediatric fellowship, and upon going to tell Ethan, she sees him holding an engagement ring. Alicia treats a child called Donnie, and is suspicious due to his mysterious admission history. Alicia goes to his house, and finds out his mother gives him insulin, and upon calling for an ambulance, the two get into a physical fight. Louise visits the food bank, due to not having enough money to eat. Alicia tells Ethan about the fellowship, and he proposes; to which she says no. The pair kiss, and Alicia leaves.
| 1114 | 21 | Episode 21 | David Innes Edwards | Pete Lawson | 26 January 2019 | 4.92 |
Iain and Ruby treat a farmer with his leg ensnared in barbed wire; when bailiffs arrive wanting to repossess the farm, he runs inside and holds them all hostage with a gun. Iain persuades the farmer to give him the gun, by telling him the gun had no bullets left. Iain checks the gun, which in fact had one bullet left.
| 1115 | 22 | Episode 22 | David Innes Edwards | Rachel Paterson | 2 February 2019 | N/A (<4.90) |
Base dies, and when drug dealer Ross is revealed to be Jan's son, Iain tries to explain that Ross is a bad person. Ross tells Jan that Iain attacked him, which she believes. Charlie attempts to persuade Jan that Iain's version of events are true, but she resists. Jade tries to keep a patient named Fiona in a bed, to which Fiona bites her. Duffy is devastated as she thinks she has forgotten Charlie's birthday; she later realises she already bought him a present but forgot.
| 1116 | 23 | Episode 23 | James Bryce | Debbie Owen | 9 February 2019 | 4.83 |
Following Jade being bitten by a patient, Louise issues body cameras to the nursing staff, in an attempt to discourage violence against them. Connie disagrees with them, saying they should only be used in a threatening situation. Ernest, a homeless patient of Louise's, begins to arrest on the way to theatre, and although attempts to revive him, he is pronounced dead. Connie explains to Lilley, Ernest's daughter, that they tried their best to save his life, but is later told she plans to write a formal complaint. On her way up the outdoor stairway, Connie is pushed down the stairs, repeatedly kicked, and left bleeding.
| 1117 | 24 | Episode 24 | James Bryce | Chris Murray | 16 February 2019 | 4.87 |
Louise finds Connie and rushes her into the ED. She finds Lilley and accuses her of assaulting Connie, but footage from a body camera proves she is innocent, forcing Louise to apologise. Louise then decides to quit the nursing profession. Iain walks out of a counselling session due to being unable to talk about his feelings. On a callout to a care home, he sees his mother, Kim, who is still angry at him for leaving her and Gem. Kim tells Iain she does not love him. After the police tell Connie that her assault was probably random, she shuts herself in her office.
| 1118 | 25 | Episode 25 | Fiona Walton | Simon Norman | 23 February 2019 | 4.93 |
At home, Iain packs his belongings into bags for a charity shop, and leaves a glass of water and a notebook on the table. Iain and Ruby get called out to a nightclub after the ceiling collapsing. Afterwards, Ruby invites him out for a drink, but he declines. Iain returns home and tries to write a letter for Gem but walks out, returning with three bottles of pills, opening one of them after contemplation.
| 1119 | 26 | Episode 26 | Steve Brett | Michelle Lipton | 2 March 2019 | 5.91 |
Jade, Dylan and Charlie become frustrated when the computers stop working. Computer monitors of patients display rapid deterioration, despite the patients being stable. Elle calls Ric, who is experiencing the same issues. Connie tells Dylan that the computer issues were caused by a member of staff opening a spam email, which Noel overhears and worries about. Ruby notices Iain's uniform is in his locker, and his photos are missing. Despite Jan saying it is probably nothing, she goes to his house and finds him unresponsive. Ruby tells Connie that she thinks he tried to kill himself, but Gem refuses to believe it, and convinces Connie to treat him for a heart attack. Ruby rushes to find evidence of suicide, to which she finds three empty bottles of pills in his neighbour's bin. Connie accepts the evidence, and later finds a large pericardial collection due to chest compressions. They cannot take him to the trauma theatre due to the locks being compromised, and when going in the lift, the lights go out throughout the hospital. This is a crossover episode with Holby City; for part two, see Holby City episode "Powerless".
| 1120 | 27 | Episode 27 | Andy Newbery | Oliver Frampton | 9 March 2019 | 5.06 |
Gem asks Ruby and Jan how Iain was acting on the day of his suicide attempt, and Ruby says that he was happier than usual. Surprised, she takes Iain's spare key to find out more information for herself. She finds a parking ticket for Mulberry Road in his pocket, and Charlie tells her that St. Simon's House is on that road. She visits, and tells Kim that Iain tried to kill himself after speaking with her. Charlie tells her to go home rather than work, and at Iain's house, she finds his scrapped suicide notes addressed to her. Gem visits Iain in ITU, and he apologises to her. Ruby and Jan help a young carer, Dani, whose mother dies. Ruby promises to help Dani in the aftermath, and Jan warns her about becoming involved.
| 1121 | 28 | Episode 28 | Andy Newbery | Hamish Wright | 23 March 2019 | 4.62 |
New registrar Archie leaves her induction day early, thinking it is a waste of time. She meets Connie, who tells her to move her car. When treating a man with burns, Archie gets punched in the face. Connie calls Archie into her office, and informs her that she called her previous hospital, who told her that Archie left due to being quick tempered with patients and colleagues. Upon attempting to order a CT scan, she is told she needs to complete her induction day modules to obtain a staff login. Duffy goes to an appointment with her neurologist, who tells her that she might be in the early stages of vascular dementia. Duffy informs Charlie, who wants to keep it a secret until it is confirmed. Dylan and Jade begin a maggot therapy trial, and Elle is told that morbidity statistics were low during her stint as clinical lead.
| 1122 | 29 | Episode 29 | Paul Riordan | Chris Lindsay and Nick Fisher | 30 March 2019 | 4.74 |
Paediatric registrar Will arrives as a locum, and clashes with Archie. He treats Toby, whose blood does not clot; he is diagnosed with leukaemia. Will promises to attend Toby's chemotherapy session, but is distracted when Connie offers him a full time position. Worried about her symptoms, Charlie sets Duffy to do paperwork handling and an early finish. Charlie snaps at Robyn and Jade, who question why she is getting treated differently. Will applies for the consultant role, and Gem thanks Ruby for saving Iain's life.
| 1123 | 30 | Episode 30 | Kate Saxon | Kim Millar | 6 April 2019 | 4.74 |
Jade is reprimanded by Charlie for making minor mistakes, and when David confronts Charlie on it, he snaps and attacks David. Connie also warns him of substantial fines for mismanagement. Jade explains to David that as she stole a car when she was 16, she cannot get her nursing registration without three referees; David agrees to be one. Iain attempts to return to work, but Jan makes him work at control in order to come back. Rash receives his and Gem's passport, but keeps it secret due to Gem prioritising Iain. Dani shows up to be taught first aid, and has the same hairstyle as Ruby; she later installs a tracking device on Ruby's phone.
| 1124 | 31 | Episode 31 | Kate Saxon | Jeff Povey | 13 April 2019 | 4.43 |
After her assault, Connie struggles to fall asleep and barricades herself in her bedroom. At work, she treats Maureen, a woman who the paramedics believe was pushed down the stairs by her husband, Bill. Bill accuses Connie of keeping his wife from him, and he tells Connie that he hates her. In resus, Maureen deteriorates and Bill makes a comment alluding to him being Connie's attacker. Charlie tells David that he will speak to Fletch about staffing levels, but instead, he tells Fletch that David pushed him. David is suspended, but Duffy urges him to stop, as she tells the team about her dementia. Ruby becomes worried when Dani shows up at the ambulance station and at casualty scenes. Connie assures Elle that she is fine, but later locks herself in her office.
| 1125 | 32 | Episode 32 | Dafydd Palfrey | Avril E Russell and Mark Catley | 20 April 2019 | 4.15 |
Rash looks at images of Vietnam on his laptop, but is interrupted by his mother, Madia. Madia drops Rash off at work, where he stares at a passing plane. Rash asks Dylan about taking a year off between F1 and F2 training, but is informed that his mother has been admitted. Madia tells Rash that his father is letting Rash use his air miles, and Rash plans to go travelling. On the way out, he almost gets hit by an ambulance, but he smiles and leaves. Elle informs David that she has been offered an interview for clinical lead at the Royal Wiltshire hospital. David suggests she tells everyone, but she keeps the news to herself. Duffy presents a "dementia-friendly cubicle", designed to keep patients comfortable. Will holds a miniature prom for Toby, who is terminally ill and has been readmitted into the ED.
| 1126 | 33 | Episode 33 | Paul Riordan | Barbara Machin | 27 April 2019 | 4.11 |
Iain starts his first shift as Wyvern Ambulance Service Communications Centre. He answers a call from a police officer, Rox Adams, who has found three unconscious men; Iain figures out that they are suffering from carbon monoxide poisoning. He attends a session with his therapist, who suggests he is improving, and that his problems stem from childhood rather than Mia and Sam's deaths. During another shift, he receives a call from a girl called Frankie who is trapped in a house fire with her sister and father. He video calls her, and talks her through putting her father in the recovery position. He later buys a plush toy for Frankie, and asks Gem to give it to her. He later deals with a call about Rox, who is suicidal; Iain manages to talk her down from a bridge.
| 1127 | 34 | Episode 34 | Daikin Marsh | Dana Fainaru | 4 May 2019 | 4.82 |
Elle gets a call from the Royal Wiltshire hospital, asking her to start her new position in two weeks; after overhearing, Jacob congratulates her and asks her to tell Connie. When Elle tells her that she is leaving, Connie congratulates her, surprising Elle. Duffy tells Charlie that she slept with Bill to feel like herself again, and that she wants to stop being treated like a patient.
| 1128 | 35 | Episode 35 | Daikin Marsh | Oliver Frampton | 11 May 2019 | 4.37 |
Will is promoted to consultant, annoying Archie who believes she is more suitable for the role. Will is put in an awkward situation when Toby asks to help him to die, to which he later refuses. At the ambulance station, Ruby sees Dani, who tells Ruby that it would have been her mother's birthday. Ruby shows Dani around the locker room, where Dani steals a stethoscope. She points out a magnet detailing the traits of a Capricorn, and talks about her mother being a stubborn Scorpio, which counteracts what she previously said about her mother's birthday; Ruby tells Dani to leave.
| 1129 | 36 | Episode 36 | Eric Styles | Rob Gittins | 25 May 2019 | 4.15 |
Hanssen confronts Connie on missing performance targets, and she convinces him that it is due to underfunding. It is revealed that Connie gave Elle a reference to the Royal Wiltshire, and Elle interrogates her on why she did it. She later tells Connie that she is leaving the ED but not taking the job at Wiltshire either, and gives Connie a number for a therapist. Jacob visits Omo, but Jet answers the door; he pushes past her but Omo tells Jacob that he is dead to her. Ruby and Iain attempt to find her missing stethoscope, and she later gives him a list of numbers to call for help; he reacts badly to the gesture.
| 1130 | 37 | Episode 37 | Eric Styles | Pete Lawson | 1 June 2019 | 3.98 |
Connie informs the team that the hospital trust have appointed a troubleshooter, Ciaran. Iain and Ruby are surprised when Jan arrives at work on her annual leave, and insists although that it is Ross' trial, she would rather work. Connie throws the business card for a therapist in the bin, and later has a panic attack in her office. Gem drops off unused diazepam from a patient in Connie's office, but while on the way to the pharmacy to return it, Connie keeps it for herself.
| 1131 | 38 | Episode 38 | Fiona Walton | Chris Murray | 8 June 2019 | 4.44 |
Dani sees a lady hurt by a motorbike accident and tells everyone that she is a paramedic and begins to assess her condition, but when Ruby and Iain arrive and recognise her, she runs away. Connie leaves the ward in Ciaran's hands while going to a conference, and he implements a rule where the team have to log their actions on the ward onto an online system, but the data from the study is later deleted. Jade expresses interest in applying for a nursing bursary, to which Marty mocks her. Ruby tells Jan about her involvement with Dani, to which Jan reprimands her. Ruby notifies Dani that her the police have been informed of her actions, and Ruby later attends a paramedic support group with Iain, where she talks about the issue.
| 1132 | 39 | Episode 39 | Fiona Walton | Johanne McAndrew and Elliot Hope | 15 June 2019 | 4.48 |
Connie returns from the conference to find that Ciaran has been working in her office. Jacob catches Jet dealing drugs outside of Omo's house, and when she blocks the doorway, he forces entry and knocks her over. Both Omo and Jet are taken to the hospital, where Omo vomits on the floor. Jacob secretly browses Omo's medical records, where he learns she has pancreatic cancer. Dylan informs him that she is not strong enough for chemotherapy, and that she has up to a couple of months to live. Jacob has Omo's medication tested at the pharmacy, and it is revealed that Jet has been selling her morphine and swapping it. Archie visits Connie in her office, and after she leaves, Connie closes the blinds and takes diazepam.
| 1133 | 40 | Episode 40 | Nimer Rashed | Claire Miller | 22 June 2019 | 4.33 |
On her way to work, Duffy assesses the condition of a girl hit by a bus. David assesses Marty and Jade on their ability of taking care of adults with minor illnesses. Jacob discovers blood in Omo's bag, and insists on taking her into hospital. Dylan informs her that her pancreatic tumour is pushing against the wall of her stomach; she refuses treatment but Jacob later convinces her otherwise. Charlie informs the department that although Duffy is not leaving, she will no longer be doing any clinical tasks.
| 1134 | 41 | Episode 41 | Julie Edwards | Rachel Paterson | 29 June 2019 | 3.99 |
Jade catches Jacob unsuccessfully trying to find details about his father on Omo's medical records; Omo's carer finds Omo collapsed on the floor and she calls for Jacob's help. Ruby explains to Jacob that Omo has a suspected neck-of-femur fracture. Dylan informs Jacob that any procedures on Omo would be too invasive, but he convinces Dylan to allow more time. Omo directs Jacob to a piece of paper at the back of her bible with his father's name on, but tells him to only look when she is dead. Jacob has Omo taken home in the back of an ambulance, and lies next to her in bed, reading John 14 to her. When Omo dies, he takes the name of his father and burns the page rather than looking at it.
| 1135 | 42 | Episode 42 | Julie Edwards | Isla Gray | 13 July 2019 | 4.24 |
As they pass the staffroom, Iain and Ruby learn that Frankie, a former patient of Iain's, has gone missing. Marty gets awarded the Wyvern Nurse Bursary, to Jade's annoyance. Iain visits Frankie's mother, and sees a photo of Frankie at a soft play area, which he visits and finds her. Jade complains to David that with her deafness, she has faced more difficulties than Marty, and reveals that she ultimately did not apply for the bursary. Jade sees Marty's phone calling, and answers to his dad, telling him about the award. When his father Graham arrives, David accidentally mentions Marty's sexuality being a difficult, and it is revealed that Marty is not out as gay to his parents. When Graham asks what David meant about his sexuality, Jade interrupts and says that she is Marty's girlfriend.
| 1136 | 43 | Episode 43 | Piotr Szkopiak | Dana Fainaru | 20 July 2019 | 4.22 |
Connie awakens in her office, and on her way home, she almost gets hit by a motorcycle, so hides in her office. She then receives an email from Hanssen, asking her to respect the board's decision about hiring Ciaran; she dismisses it and takes a diazepam tablet. Connie appears in resus and fills a syringe with local anaesthetic, as a patient begins to shout in pain – Archie discovers her cannula is kinked, and Connie suggests flushing it with saline. When Duffy arrives, Connie asks her to flush the cannula; while Duffy is not supposed to do clinical tasks, she agrees. Connie tells her that the saline syringe is closest to her. One patient begins to have a seizure and a cardiac arrest, as the other shouts in pain at a wound being sutured; Connie then realises the mistake she has made by not labelling the syringes.
| 1137 | 44 | Episode 44 | Piotr Szkopiak | Nick Fisher and Dana Fainaru | 27 July 2019 | 4.28 |
Charlie visits Connie in her office, and she shows him her letter of resignation. Archie tells Will that the mixup was Connie's fault, but he suggests she needs proof. Rosa Cadenas, the new porter, introduces herself to David and later fixes his car. After taking a diazepam tablet, Connie finds the syringes from the accident, and disposes of them. Connie asks Duffy what she remembers of the incident, and asks if she checked the labels, leaving Duffy questioning her memory. Duffy packs her belongings and apologises to Connie for her mistake, and although Connie urges her to stay, she insists on leaving. Archie and Ciaran overhear, and Ciaran accuses her of "throwing Duffy under the bus in cold blood", leaving Connie worried.
| 1138 | 45 | Episode 45 | James Bryce | Colin Bytheway | 3 August 2019 | 4.49 |
Marty's mother Bibi insists to Graham that Jade is not right for Marty, and then collapses. Dylan informs Bibi that her heart monitor is showing heart block. Speaking to Marty, Bibi tells him that she knows he is gay, and has known for years. Will tells Archie that he saw Connie taking diazepam in her office. Marty comes out as gay to his father, who takes it negatively and suggests that they no longer see each other. Archie goes into Connie's office, and finds the diazepam. Later that day, Ciaran enters her office and demands to search her desk for diazepam, but does not find it as she has hidden it in her handbag.
| 1139 | 46 | Episode 46 | Alex Jacob | Hilary Frankland, Patrick Homes & Katie Douglas | 10 August 2019 | 4.94 |
Day one Connie learns that all benzodiazepine prescriptions must be double-signed due to an initiative from Hanssen. She takes over the inquiry and requests the ED's script records for the last three months. Ciaran is later called into Connie's office, where Hanssen explains that a staff member has been prescribing three times as many benzodiazepines as other colleagues. Ciaran blames Connie, but Hanssen informs him that the hospital will not be renewing his contract. Before leaving, Ciaran tells Archie that she needs to continue pursuing Connie. New emergency care assistant Siobhan assists Iain on a callout to a road traffic collision, but it soon emerges that she is an alcoholic, and has been drinking while on duty. Gem expresses her desire to join Rash while he is travelling, and Iain gives her the money she needs to leave Holby. Day two In a multi-storey car park, Duffy reverses her car as a girl named Shanti runs out behind it and falls to the ground. Shanti insists she has a broken arm, but Duffy knows she is lying to scam vulnerable people. Connie writes herself a prescription for diazepam, and goes to a local pharmacy to collect it. Archie follows Connie and confronts her, but they soon become caught up in a hostage situation, as the pharmacist is held at knifepoint by a drug addict, who Connie recognises as her daughter's former babysitter, Michelle. Connie attempts to defuse the situation, but Archie is stabbed. She is stabilised at the hospital. Connie tells Charlie about her drug addiction and how she let Duffy take the blame for her mistake. Charlie is disgusted with her and tells her to go. Note: this was a feature length episode. It was originally meant to be two singular episodes, but was merged into one.

== Reception ==
The drama was nominated in the "Best Soap (Evening)" category at the 2018 Digital Spy Reader Awards; it came in last place with 3.8% of the total votes.
