= Iain Dean =

- Casualty character
- First appearance: "Appropriate Force"; 28 April 2012
- Portrayed by: Michael Stevenson
- Duration: 2012–2019, 2021–
- Spinoff(s): "Under Fire" (2012); "Scars and Nightmares" (2013); Holby City; (2016, 2017, 2019, 2021)

In-universe information
- Occupation: Specialist Paramedic Critical Care; (prev. Army corporal; Emergency call handler; Paramedic; HEMS Paramedic)
- Spouse: Faith Cadogan
- Significant others: Rita Freeman; Lily Chao; Chrissie Danes
- Children: Pearl (daughter)
- Relatives: Kim Harrison (mother); Gemma Dean (sister)

Iain Dean is a fictional character from the British medical drama Casualty, played by Michael Stevenson. He was first introduced in a Red Button episode, which explores Sam Nicholls's (Charlotte Salt) fictional backstory as a medic in the army, alongside Iain with whom she is having an affair. The character then made his first appearance in the main show in the twenty-sixth series episode "Appropriate Force", broadcast on 28 April 2012. Iain gives evidence during a General Medical Council hearing, after Sam is accused of assaulting a patient. He returned in August 2013 this time as a trainee paramedic, who works alongside Jeff Collier (Matt Bardock) and Dixie Dixon (Jane Hazlegrove). He is also reunited with Sam, who is now in a relationship with Tom Kent (Oliver Coleman). Stevenson confirmed that Sam was Iain's reason for coming back to Holby, and that he had hoped to start up their romance again. In November 2013, the character was the focus of another Red Button special, which helped to mark Remembrance Day and explore Iain's time in the army and relationship with Sam. It later emerges that Iain has posttraumatic stress disorder from being one of two survivors of a suicide attack in Afghanistan. Stevenson was pleased to have the chance to look further into his character's backstory. Following an incident in which Iain is held hostage and Big Mac (Charles Dale) is injured, he leaves Holby in the episode broadcast on 22 March 2014.

Stevenson returned as a regular cast member in October 2014, following the departure of Bardock, whose character was killed off. Iain becomes Dixie's new partner as he joins the paramedic crew. Iain establishes a romantic relationship with nurse Rita Freeman (Chloe Howman), which producer Erika Hossington said would be different from the other romances on the show. She also said it would eventually become much darker and the storyline sees Rita lying to Iain about her former husband stalking her, which results in their break-up. In early 2017, two members of Iain's family were introduced, leading to further exploration of his past. His younger sister Gemma "Gem" Dean (Rebecca Ryan) arrived first, followed by their mother Kim Harrison (Siân Reeves). Stevenson described the relationship between Iain and Kim as "frosty", while a critic noted that the siblings' relationship was "complicated". In the midst of Gem's introduction, Iain forms a romantic relationship with Lily Chao (Crystal Yu). After an initial bad start, the pair make their relationship official, just as Sam returns to the hospital. Lily's jealously over Iain and Sam's friendship leads to their break-up and Lily leaves for a research post. Stevenson thought Lily and Iain were one of the strongest pairings on the show.

In August 2018, the character is involved in a series of events that change his life forever. The story arc begins with Iain choosing to leave the scene of a call-out to treat Alicia Munroe (Chelsea Halfpenny). On the way to the hospital, he is forced to swerve the ambulance carrying himself, Alicia and Ruby Spark (Maddy Hill), leading to a large pile-up. A fuel tanker subsequently crashes and explodes injuring Sam, who later dies despite Iain's attempts to save her. Stevenson said the repercussions would go on for a long time, as Iain spirals into depression and eventually attempts to take his life. Stevenson commended the producers for allowing Iain's story to span 47 episodes of Casualty. In a special episode airing in April 2019, viewers follow Iain's return to work at the ambulance control centre. Stevenson thought it was important to show that it was not easy to move on from depression, and that it was just the beginning of his character's journey. In May, it was announced that Stevenson was to leave Casualty. He revealed that his departure was not planned, but happened "organically" as part of Iain's mental health storyline. Hazlegrove reprised her role as Dixie, who offers Iain a job with the Helicopter Emergency Medical Service (HEMS), and he departed on 21 September 2019.

The character returns during the thirty-fifth series on 10 April 2021. Stevenson's return was announced in December 2020, but it was delayed by the COVID-19 pandemic. Stevenson said he wanted Iain to return with a better state of mind and asked producers to bring back Iain's "loveable" persona. Upon Iain's return, he immediately sets out to help his boss Jan Jenning (Di Botcher), who is being forced to smuggle drugs into a prison for her son. Stevenson said Iain would stand by Jan. He also believed that Iain needed to get back on the paramedic team. Towards the end of 2021, producers cast Stevenson's wife Lauren Crace as Iain's HEMS partner and new love interest, Chrissie Danes.

== Development ==
=== Characterisation ===
Iain is an ex-corporal who wants to take his action-man status from the battlefields of Afghanistan to the streets of Holby. He’s a proper man's man; a lad, and will always be the first to rush into a dangerous situation. However, his impulsive nature and recklessness don't always offer the best solution, and often land him in trouble.

— An excerpt from the character's profile on the official Casualty website.

The character's biography on the official Casualty website noted that Iain's "mental scars" from his time in the army had not fully healed, and his behaviour was often affected by the "bad memories". It stated that Iain has a temper, "a strong sense of justice", and a "caring" side. The profile also said that Iain enjoys "a bit of banter and a pint in the pub." Holly Wade of the Radio Times described the character as "a little over-confident" and had to be "kept in line" by the hospital staff. Stevenson liked that his character had flaws and was not perfect. He commented "for all his fun traits, there's a darker, moodier side." Stevenson said Iain could be relied on to put a smile on someone's face with even the smallest comment or gesture. An Inside Soap writer observed that Iain was "clam and collected on the job".

Stevenson found that getting out of the studio and filming on location was the best part of playing a paramedic. He enjoyed getting to "do all the fun stuff" like rescues and car crashes. He also said that the stunts were great to film.

=== Introduction and early storylines ===
Michael Stevenson was initially hired to play Corporal Iain Dean for one storyline. He was introduced as a former love interest of Sam Nicholls (Charlotte Salt). He first appears in the April 2012 Red Button episode "Under Fire", which explores Sam's time in Afghanistan. The episode is set in Camp Bastion and explores Sam's time working on a Medical Emergency Response helicopter, alongside Iain, with whom she is having an affair. The episode was filmed at an army barracks in Cardiff. Iain makes his first appearance in Casualty during the twenty sixth series. He is called to give evidence during Sam's General Medical Council (GMC) hearing for assaulting a patient. He explains that Sam has been greatly affected by the events in Afghanistan.

The character returned in late August 2013 as a trainee paramedic. Iain is assigned to work with Jeff Collier (Matt Bardock) and Dixie Dixon (Jane Hazlegrove). Dixie thinks Iain will be trouble, while Daniel Kilkelly of Digital Spy observed that he was "extremely confident and may need to be kept in line." The crew are called out to a bus crash, where Iain rescues a woman shortly before the bus explodes. Later on, he is reprimanded by Jeff for not listening to instructions and putting a patient in danger. In the emergency department (ED) Sam is "shocked" to see Iain is now working at Holby. She questions whether he is there for her, as he appears to be jealous of her partner, Tom Kent (Oliver Coleman).

Iain's working relationship with Jeff suffers when he disobeys direct orders again. The story begins with Iain and Jeff being called out to treat a stab victim, after which the ambulance becomes stuck on an embankment. Knowing the vehicle could tip over, Iain grabs Jeff and pulls him over to one side to help stabilise it, which leaves Jeff "furious", as he has put their patient's life at risk. Dixie asks Jeff to go easy on Iain, since he did save their lives, but Jeff believes he is a "liability".

In November 2013, the character was the focus of another Red Button special. Titled "Scars and Nightmares", the episode was broadcast to mark Remembrance Day and explored Iain's time in the army and his feelings for Sam. The plot sees Iain agree to visit former soldier and colleague Kenny Archer (James Wallwork) in hospital. Iain asks Sam to come with him and they are both surprised to find that Kenny is actually in a rehabilitation centre, as he is suffering from posttraumatic stress disorder. Kenny believes Sam and Iain are a couple, and tells her about some letters Iain wrote to her, which she did not receive. The show's executive producer Oliver Kent explained that the team wanted to return to Sam and Iain's history, as it had briefly been touched on, but not explored any further until that point.

Tom becomes jealous of Sam and Iain's friendship, especially after learning that they took a trip to Birmingham to visit a former army colleague. He confronts Sam about keeping the trip from him, and she explains that his jealous reaction is the reason why. After Tom asks Sam to think about whether she really wants to marry him, she and Iain go out drinking together and end up kissing. Stevenson later confirmed that Sam was the reason Iain came to Holby, saying "He was hoping to rekindle the relationship they'd had in Afghanistan. He thought she would be someone he could get close to, and could understand what he'd been through. But he discovered she had a boyfriend, Tom, who she ended up marrying."

=== PTSD and hostage situation ===
After Sam and Tom marry and leave Holby, Iain is left "festering in his own problems" and it emerges that he has posttraumatic stress disorder. Stevenson was pleased to be exploring his character's backstory further, saying: "I've been so lucky to come straight into the love story with Sam and then for this other storyline to develop. I always knew of the history of the character and that Iain has a secret from Afghanistan when I joined Casualty. But my character was never intended to be as involved as he's become." Iain and Big Mac (Charles Dale) are called to treat Beth Archer (Rachel Elizabeth), the wife of Iain's former army colleague, Kenny. Beth has been burnt following an argument with Kenny, who she says has been greatly affected by his time in the army, putting a strain on their marriage. Beth asks Iain not to tell Kenny they have been talking, as he is paranoid. However, Kenny already suspects that she and Iain are having an affair.

In a two-part episode, Iain and Kenny's history in Afghanistan is revealed. Stevenson explained that the men were the only survivors of a suicide attack. As Iain struggles to talk about what happened, because he thinks it is his fault, Kenny struggles to understand why they were the only ones to survive. Stevenson said the bomber was an Afghan boy that Iain had been training up, so he feels that he should have seen the attack coming. Kenny is "really cut up" and continues to think Beth and Iain are having an affair, because Iain cannot tell him that he is responsible for killing their friends. The storyline concludes with Kenny holding Iain and Big Mac hostage. Kenny comes to the ambulance station to confront Iain, but Big Mac refuses to tell him where Iain is. They get into a fight and Big Mac falls and hits his head. When Iain returns to the station, Kenny blocks the door and tries to force him into admitting that he is having an affair by refusing to let Big Mac go. Kenny is later arrested, while Big Mac recovers in the hospital.

Following the incident, Ian struggles to get back to normal, as he carries "a lot of guilt" about Afghanistan and Big Mac's injury. Stevenson said Iain initially feels that he "isn't strong enough" to open up to Big Mac, and does not really have anyone else to confide in. When his guilt starts affecting his work, Dixie suggests he does talk with Big Mac, who also served in the army and knows what is going on with Iain. Iain departed in the series 28 episode "The Lies We Tell", broadcast on 22 March 2014.

=== Reintroduction ===
In August 2014, series producer Erika Hossington confirmed that Stevenson would be returning to the show as a regular cast member. She thought it would be "fun establishing his partnership with Dixie", following Jeff's death. Stevenson reprised the role in the 11 October episode "The Last Call". Iain returns to Holby for Jeff's funeral. After learning that Dixie plans to avoid the service, he convinces her to attend with "some tough words". Later that day, Iain receives a job offer to re-join the paramedic crew.

Iain and Dixie later fall out over the way they work. Dixie is suffering in the wake of Jeff's death and has become more cautious, where as Iain wants to "get into the thick of any action..." After they are called out to a caravan on the edge of a cliff, Dixie insists on asking for and waiting for backup, but Iain insists on going inside to help the patients. Dixie feels that she has to follow him, but after getting everyone out, she is "visibly shaken".

==== Relationship with Rita Freeman ====
In October 2015, producers established a romantic relationship between Iain and nurse Rita Freeman (Chloe Howman). On the first anniversary of Jeff's death, Iain and Dixie are sent for Height and Rescue Training (HART), and they are both attracted to their instructor Jess Cranham (Kerry Bennett). When Jess later turns up at the station, Iain thinks she is there for him, but she asks Dixie out instead. A "dejected" Iain goes to the local pub, where he makes advances towards Rita, who reciprocates. Iain asks Rita if she wants a one-night stand and she agrees. Producer Erika Hossington said Iain and Rita's relationship would "be full of surprises and it's going to be very different from the other romances that people have seen on the show." Hossington also said that they would have fun together, but the storyline would soon become much darker. Howman told Elaine Reilly of What's on TV that Iain is the first man Rita has dated since her former husband Mark Richie (Joel Beckett), who was a paedophile. She explained that developing feelings for Iain was a big deal for Rita.

Iain soon starts having doubts about the relationship. When Rita's car tyres are slashed, she and Iain think Mark is responsible. Iain gives Rita the keys to his flat, so she can stay awhile. Rita soon learns from the police that her tyres were actually slashed as practical joke, but she keeps the news to herself. At the end of his shift, Iain flirts with another nurse. A jealous Rita lies to Iain that Mark is stalking her. Iain eventually breaks up with Rita, and she tries to avoid him, as things are awkward between them. When she sees him coming into work, Rita ducks behind a car and hits her face on a wing mirror, which results in a black eye. Rita is "mortified" and lets Iain think that Mark has attacked her. The rest of the ED staff give Iain the "cold shoulder" over his treatment of Rita, which makes him feel bad and he decides to track down Mark. After her lie is exposed, Rita's colleagues turn against her. She finds Iain to apologise, but he tells her to do the "decent thing" and quit her job.

==== Introduction of family ====
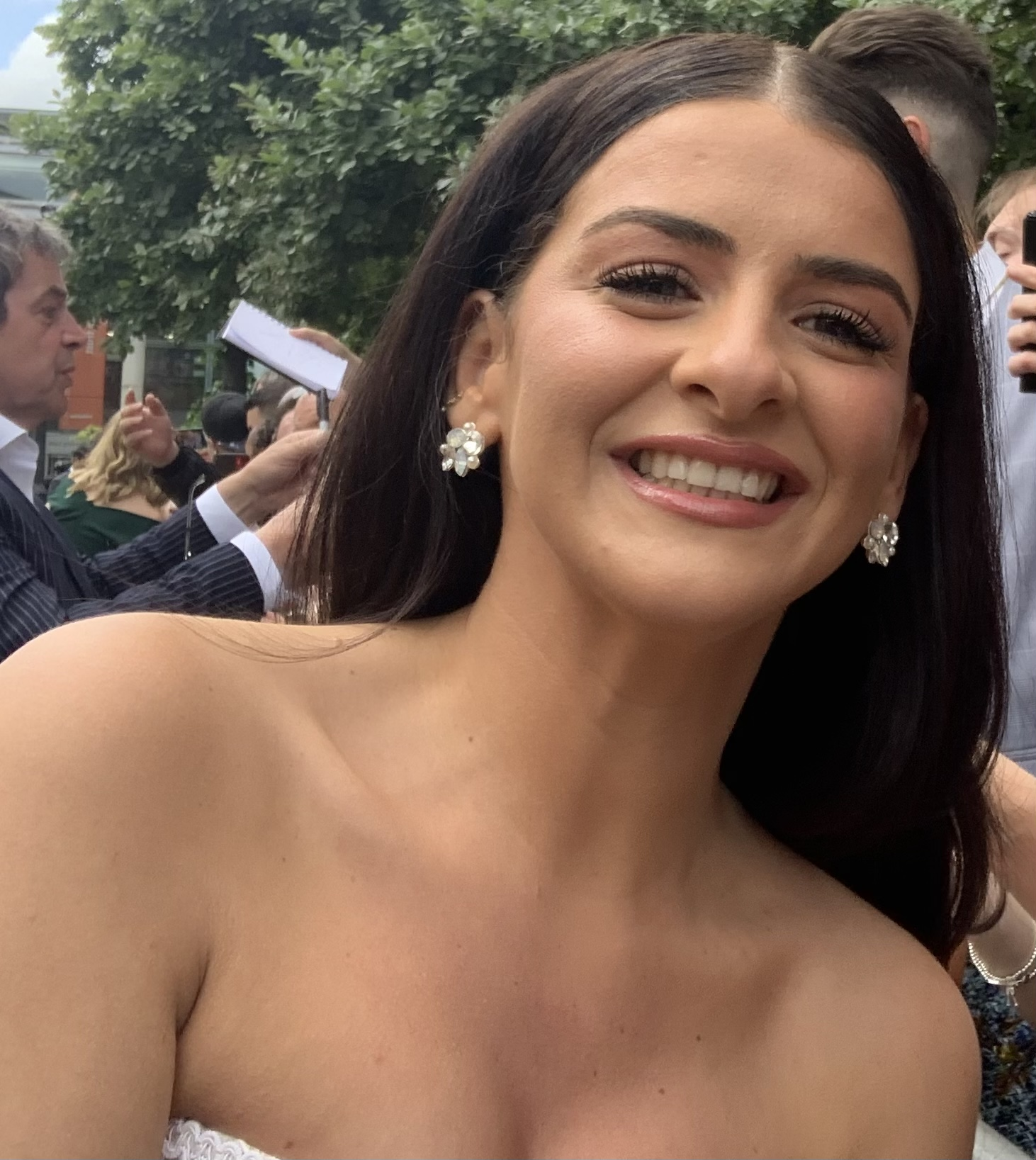
Rebecca Ryan (pictured) was cast as Iain's sister Gem in 2017, leading to further exploration of his backstory.

Producers began introducing members of Iain's family in early 2017. Stevenson was excited by the development, saying "I always thought it would be fun to play, because in three years we've never delved into Iain's past. I knew it wouldn't be a bed of roses, or else why would he keep it under wraps?" The first member to be introduced is Iain's younger sister Gemma "Gem" Dean (Rebecca Ryan), who turns up at the ambulance station unexpectedly. It soon becomes clear that she and Iain have not seen each other in some years. When Iain realises she is seriously injured, he has Gemma admitted to the ED to be treated by Lily Chao (Crystal Yu). Lily becomes suspicious that there is something else going on with Gem and Iain is "furious" to learn that his sister is actually on day release from a young offenders unit. He also discovers that she got her injuries from attacking her case worker. Stevenson said it was "amazing" to be working with Ryan. He explained that when they were casting the role of Iain's sister, he knew "that would take it to the next level." He and Ryan spent a few months getting to know each other off-screen and he said that there was "a lot more" to come from their relationship.

The following month, Gem returns to Iain's life. Sarah Ellis of Inside Soap pointed out that the siblings did not part on good terms. Stevenson told her that Lily gets Iain a visiting order to see Gem, but she "stands him up" and refuses to see him. During his next shift, Iain receives a call to a woman who has taken a fall, and he finds his mother Kim Harrison (Siân Reeves) and Gem. Stevenson said Gem has been released from prison, but she did not want Iain to know because she was angry with him. Stevenson described the relationship between Iain and Kim as "frosty" and said it was not "a happy reunion" because there is a lot of history and demons between them. He added "There's always a connection between mother and son, and we wanted to work hard at that rather than it being a one-dimensional, dysfunctional family."

Gem was reintroduced in March 2018, after she is released from prison, where she was serving a sentence for striking Lily with a car. She moves in with Iain, who manages to get her a job as a porter at the hospital. Elaine Reilly of What's on TV noted that the siblings had "a complicated relationship", explaining that Iain wanted to make up for not getting in contact with his family when he returned home from Afghanistan. Producers also reintroduced Kim in February 2019 in the midst of Iain's depression storyline. Iain sees Kim when he attends call out to the St James' hospice, but he "refuses to acknowledge her" until he speaks with Gem, who helps him recall the good times they all had together and Iain goes back to speak to Kim.

==== Relationship with Lily Chao ====
A romantic connection forms between Iain and Lily, as she helps out his sister Gem. Yu commented that she enjoyed working with Stevenson and hinted that there would be some interesting storylines coming up for the pair. Iain and Lily later have sex in a hearse, which Yu described as "fun to do, but cold". She was surprised about the big reaction it got on Twitter. Following their "fling", things do not end well between the pair. They are forced together when Iain offers to be Lily's date for her cousin's wedding instead of Ethan Hardy (George Rainsford). Lily is "not keen" on introducing Iain to her family, as they believe she is dating a doctor and not a paramedic. But she has no other option and accepts Iain's offer, however, the day gets off to a bad start when Iain crashes the car into a field. The events of the day bring the couple together and they later make their relationship official, just as Sam returns to the hospital. Their romance is soon tested by Sam, who has retrained as a paramedic. When Lily learns of their history, she becomes jealous and asks to spend the day observing the paramedics. Iain and Sam are happy to take Lily out, until she tries to treat a patient and Sam has to rebuke her. Yu said her character has never fallen in love in the way she has fallen for Iain, noting that Iain "caught her off guard." She also said that Sam's return has brought out Lily's insecure side for the first time.

Following Yu's decision to leave Casualty, Iain and Lily break up because of her jealousy and she leaves for a research post in Hong Kong. Of the state of Iain and Lily's relationship, Yu stated "The fact is Iain's been reluctant to talk to Lily about their relationship recently. She was standing in front of Iain asking him to talk to her and he didn't want to. Walking away from Iain is probably one of the hardest things Lily's had to do but she needed to because she needed to rescue herself from this version of herself she's become." Yu explained that Lily does not like seeing herself as a jealous, out of control person, so the research post came along at the right time. She also said "Whatever is going on between Sam and Iain has to find its own resolution." Yu thought Lily would have stayed in Holby if there was no research post, but she and Iain would have still broken up. Lily would also be very hurt if she had to see him get back together with Sam. Stevenson later said that Lily and Iain were a good match, and thought they brought out "a great side of each other." He also believed it was one of the strongest pairings on the show at the time.

=== Depression and suicide attempt ===
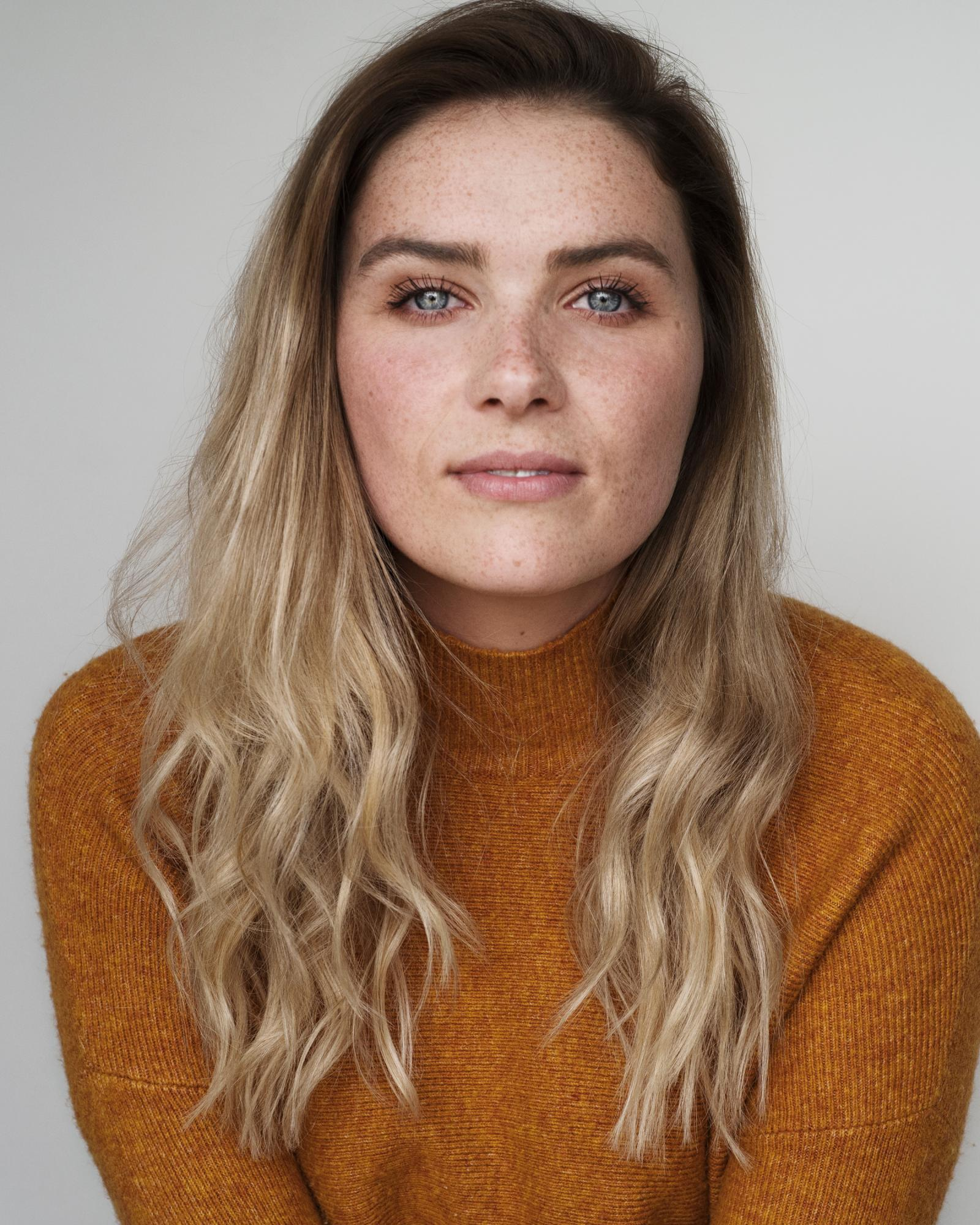
Iain's decision to attend a call out to an injured Alicia Munroe, played by Chelsea Halfpenny (pictured), sparks a chain of events that culminates in him attempting suicide.

In August 2018, Stevenson confirmed a series of events in "Episode 1094" would not only hit his character hard, but change his life forever. The episode follows the previous series' cliffhanger which saw the ambulance carrying Iain, Ruby Spark (Maddy Hill), and the injured doctor Alicia Munroe (Chelsea Halfpenny) flip on its side, causing a major incident. It was confirmed that the episode would see multiple deaths. Stevenson said that Iain's decision to treat Alicia "sparks" the events in the episode, but when asked why Iain was forced to swerve the ambulance, Stevenson explained "The crash takes Iain by surprise. What happens in that moment is completely out of his hands. It's what comes before the crash that leaves questions opened to be answered..." The episode reveals that Iain swerved to miss Mia Bellis (Simona Zivkovska) when she jumped from a bridge. He and Ruby had to leave Mia earlier that evening to attend the incident at Alicia's house. The crashed ambulance causes a fuel tanker to also crash, causing a large car pile-up. Stevenson was in awe at the scale of the set that was created for the episode. He also enjoyed being involved with the stunts, which he felt taught him a lot. The episode ends with the surprise death of Sam, who was injured in the resulting explosion, and Iain "desperately" attempting resuscitation.

Allison Jones of Inside Soap noted that with Iain having to make such a difficult decision in the moment, the aftermath is "devastating" for him and would affect him for weeks to come. Stevenson told Jones: "This episode in particular sends Iain to places he's never contemplated. We want to show how stretched paramedics are in the real world, and how much responsibility they have – so much is asked of them. There are repercussions for Iain which can't be dealt with overnight, and he has a long journey ahead of him." The following episode sees Iain "coping particularly badly" with Sam's death. He blames himself and admits to his boss Jan Jenning (Di Botcher) that he could have stopped Mia from jumping off the bridge, but he chose to attend the call out to Alicia instead. Jan encourages Iain to stick to his statement and deny responsibility.

Iain spirals into depression which spans many months and eventually culminates in him deciding to end his life. Sarah Ellis of Inside Soap believed the development would come as a big shock to viewers, with many of them finding the episode in which Iain makes his decision sad to watch. Stevenson hoped viewers would not be too angry with Iain, saying "It's a massive relief for Iain, and far outweighs the guilt about those he's leaving behind. After a year of going through what's he's been through, all that worry will finally be over." Stevenson made it clear that his character was not happy about his decision and hoped the viewers would sympathise with him. The episode follows Iain as he carries out what he believes will be his final shift and deal with a typical day of call-outs. Everything appears normal on the outside, which Stevenson said was deliberate, as the writers wanted to show that there are not always signs someone is suffering from depression. He said viewers would see something is happening with Iain, but no one at the hospital would because Iain does not want the attention. Stevenson continued: "He loves his job, and any sign of what's he going through would result in him having to open up to somebody, which is not him at all. He's been taught to dust himself off and get on with things."

During his shift, Iain helps Ruby with "a particularly difficult situation" and despite knowing that he has people who care for him, it does not deter Iain from his plan. Stevenson pointed out that post-traumatic stress disorder and depression do not always manifest in the same way, so the storyline might not "hit home" with everyone, but he commended the producers for allowing Iain's story to span 47 episodes of Casualty. He also believed some viewers would be frustrated that Iain did not take up the opportunities afforded to him, such as counselling. He hoped that the episode would make the audience realise that there are better options available than the one Iain has chosen. In the first part of the Casualty and Holby City crossover "CasualtyXHolby", Ruby finds Iain at his home, after he has attempted to take his own life with an overdose. As he is brought into the ED, Connie Beauchamp (Amanda Mealing) takes over his treatment. In the midst of this, a cyberattack causes a blackout and stops vital equipment from working, leaving Iain's life in jeopardy. As the crossover continues, Connie and her rival Jac Naylor (Rosie Marcel) attempt to save the lives of their colleagues, with Sacha Levy (Bob Barrett) also in trouble. Barrett commented "Iain is on a stretcher in the corridor while Sacha is on the floor in another."

On 27 April 2019, Casualty aired a special episode that centred on Iain's return to work in the wake of his suicide attempt. While Iain plans to get back out in the ambulance, Jan orders him to work some shifts in the control centre beforehand, which pushes Iain "right out of his comfort zone". Stevenson told Ellis that it was important to show viewers that it was not easy to move on from depression, and that this was just the beginning of his character's journey. Stevenson said "He certainly isn't fully recovered by the end of the episode. Obviously we all want to see Iain back at work on the ambulance, but it's not as simple as that. This episode sets Iain off on a journey. It goes beyond mental health issues – we dig right into the emergency services and the support that's on offer. It's more about Iain accepting the help that's available to him, and becoming aware that there is hope." Stevenson spent a day in a real call centre and spoke with the call handlers to learn how they behave. He also revealed that the handlers in the background of the episode were real handlers who helped advise him during filming. Producers introduced actress Frances Barber as Iain's therapist Claire Wakelins with whom he forms an important relationship. Although he dismissed therapy before his suicide attempt, this time around proves to be "invaluable to him." Stevenson explained that Iain does not like to open up and is in denial about what therapy can do for him, as he thinks she can do it alone. However Claire "takes him on a journey that shocks him and makes him feel uncomfortable, she says things to him that nobody has ever said before." Writers worked with the mental health charity MIND for the storyline, while Stevenson spoke with people at Our Blue Light, a charity which supports the mental health of emergency service workers. He believed Casualty was the only television drama that could tell the story from the point of view of a paramedic, and he recalled how he met the real-life paramedic from the documentary series Ambulance whose story he based the majority of Iain's journey on.

=== Departure ===
On 20 May 2019, Jess Lee of Digital Spy reported that the character would be leaving the drama, as Stevenson was taking a break. Lee confirmed that he had already filmed his final scenes. Stevenson stated "With huge sadness but immense pride, I have decided to take a break from this amazing show. Playing the role of Iain Dean has been a pure pleasure over the past six years, and I have nothing but fine and fond memories. I have laughed every day and wish to thank everyone involved at Casualty for making my time here unforgettable." Stevenson thanked the fans for supporting his character through his mental health storyline, and expressed how proud he was of his work during it. He added that Iain's journey would continue in the future. The show's executive producer Simon Harper praised Stevenson for "carrying the lion's share" of the work in the thirty-third series and said the door would be open for a return. Ahead of his departure, series producer Loretta Preece confirmed that there were no "firm" plans for Iain to return. She also spoke about his departure storyline, explaining that Iain would still be processing everything and the episodes would be moving and "perfectly judged".

Ahead of Iain's departure, Hazlegrove reprised her role as Dixie. Her reappearance in Iain's life leads him to accept a job with the Helicopter Emergency Medical Service (HEMS). Iain struggles to tell Jan and Ruby that he is leaving, until Dixie accidentally reveals the news to them, leaving the pair "stunned". Stevenson told Inside Soap's Alice Penwill that Iain seemingly misunderstands their muted reaction, saying "Iain's only just reached a point where he seems to be settling back into work and showing signs of recovery. For them, I think they're worried that Iain might be rushing into the next stage." Iain is shown having doubts about his decision, but he comes to a realisation after spending time bonding with a patient who was recently sectioned. Stevenson said that Iain can see his own life being played out through the patient, and he realises that remaining at Holby could be "a constant reminder of what he still has to get over." Stevenson told Penwill that Iain needs to regain his independence and identity, and he can only do that by himself. The character departed in the episode broadcast on 21 September 2019.

When asked if it was the right decision for Iain to leave, Stevenson explained that his character enjoys a new challenge and that a job opportunity away from Holby was the right move. He liked that Iain joined the HEMS team, as the writers had wanted to give him more training and have him carry out roadside operations for a while. He thought it would be exciting to play out when Iain returned. Stevenson was also grateful that Hazlegrove returned as Dixie and he enjoyed working with her, Botcher and Hill, calling their characters "the three women who have been his anchor points while he's been at Holby". Stevenson believed that Iain's story came to "a natural position" where it was time to have a rest from it, joking that he had had a busy year. He also said that the team worked hard to finish his character's mental health storyline on a positive note, and he felt that it was better to leave viewers wanting more. He admitted that he very emotional on his final day of filming, as well as exhausted from all the work he had put into that year. However, when he looked back on it, he felt proud of the work he put into Iain's story and was happy where it was left. He also explained to Digital Spy's Sophie Dainty that his departure was not planned, but the development "happened organically" as part of Iain's story.

=== Return (2021) ===
"I've loved being part of Casualty since my very first day on set. I knew then I wanted to be part of the show's long history and I'm proud I'm still here.

— Stevenson on his time in Casualty.

Stevenson's return to the series was announced on 17 December 2020 via a promotional Christmas video. Stevenson was excited at returning to Casualty and he admitted to missing the show. He also said that he was looking forward to exploring new stories for Iain. Stevenson's return ended up being delayed by the COVID-19 pandemic. He estimated that he was coming back around six months later than had been originally planned. He also stated "When the producers got in contact and stuck to their word by asking me to come back, it was a no brainer. It's home to me. The show has been very good to me and so there was nothing to think about really." Stevenson explained that Iain is in a better place than when the audience last saw him and he has had a good time working for HEMS. Stevenson said Iain had "definitely changed" and that it was important for him to come back in "a better state of mind." He also explained that it was important that Iain came back as the character everyone knew before his depression and suicide attempt. He spoke with producers about bringing Iain's "loveable" persona back, as he wanted him to go "full circle."

Iain returns during the thirty-fifth series on 10 April 2021. Iain encounters Jan at the local prison, where she is being forced to smuggle drugs for her son, Ross West (Chris Gordon). Iain is responding to the same emergency call and sees Jan making a drop. He later seeks Jan out to ask what is going on. Stevenson described Jan as being "in the depths of despair. She is on her knees and desperate and Iain won't think twice about helping her. He might not want to get involved straight away but the fact that it's Ross means there are definitely some scores to settle there." Iain is "completely shocked" when he learns of the mess Jan is in. Stevenson stated Iain would stand by her, but with her son in prison it would not be that simple. Stevenson later said Iain was "set on standing by Jan" and helping her to get out of the bad situation she has found herself in. He thought Iain needed to be close to Jan and get back on the paramedic team, but his character would soon realise that it would not be "quite as straightforward as he'd like." Iain later goes up against trainee paramedic Leon Cook (Bobby Lockwood) when they both interview for a permanent position at the hospital. Iain decides he is ready to come back to the hospital full-time, but on the day of his interview Iain gets "side-tracked" when Jan says she is going to confess to smuggling drugs into the prison.

Towards the end of 2021, producers cast Stevenson's wife and fellow actor Lauren Crace as Chrissie Danes, Iain's HEMS partner and new love interest. Digital Spy's Amy West thought the couple's relationship might be "short-lived, though" when they attend the scene of a van on the edge of a ravine. Iain is "desperate to help" and abseils into the van, despite Chrissie asking him to wait until backup arrives. Inside, Iain finds Zamir Dervishi (Aris Furtuna) and Jed Peterson (Darren Tighe). Iain manages to move Zamir to safety, while he treats Peterson, who tells him about his life married to Zamir's mother, who is a refugee. Zamir objects to this, angering Peterson, who "launches himself" at Zamir and causes the van to fall over the edge into the water below. Iain and Chrissie's romance is revisited the following year when Crace reprised her role. Iain and Chrissie are forced to work together again, which leaves Iain "furious" as she instigated their break-up. Iain refuses to listen or accept Chrissie's apology. However, while treating a patient for PTSD, Chrissie becomes emotional and when Iain forces her to be honest about the circumstances of their break-up, she admits that she has been suffering with PTSD since he was badly injured in the ravine incident.

== Reception ==
For his performance as Iain, Stevenson received a nomination for Best Drama Star at the 2019 Inside Soap Awards. Iain's depression plot won Best Drama Storyline. Stevenson was also included on the longlist for the Drama Performance accolade at the National Television Awards. The following year, he was nominated in the same category. In 2025, Stevenson won Best Drama Star at the Inside Soap Awards. That year, Steven also received a nomination in the "Soaps - Best Actor" category the Digital Spy Reader Awards. Iain and Faith were also nominated for the "Best Soap Couple" award.

While reviewing the show, Alison Graham of the Radio Times observed that Iain and Gemma's reunion was "a touching story" that had been "bubbling for a wee while". She thought that the siblings "have done well to turn out as they have" with having Kim for a mother. Graham's colleague Emma Bullimore enjoyed Lily and Iain's romance, saying they were "one of the most unlikely but cutest couples the ED has ever seen. We were rooting for them – especially during their wildly inappropriate romantic encounter in a hearse."

Bullimore later named Iain and Lily as one of the show's "best romances", stating "This really shouldn't have worked. Iain's previous relationship with Rita failed because he couldn't commit, meanwhile Lily had a five year plan stuck on the door of her locker. Iain was a fun-loving guy who would get the first round in, Lily's version of fun was staying late at work to get some extra surgical experience. But somehow they just clicked – she kept him on his toes and he was a smitten puppy dog around her."

In February 2019, Digital Spy's Sophie Dainty chose Iain as one of a handful of characters for viewers to keep an eye on, writing that "his nightmare just keeps getting worse and worse." Dainty noted that Iain's "darkest day" was yet to come. The BBC named the moment Iain and Sam rescue a boy trapped in a storm drain as one of their "unforgettable Casualty moments", along with the scene in which Iain cleans the ambulance naked. Holly Wade of the Radio Times listed Iain's memorable moments as his arrival in 2012, his return as a paramedic, and how he "proved his worth" by rescuing a patient from a bus crash.

Calli Kitson of the Metro praised Iain's mental health storyline for changing her life. She also named Iain, Dylan Keogh (Will Beck), and David Hide (Jason Durr) as "three incredibly complex members of the ED who are interesting on screen because of what they've been through."
