= Episode 1094 =

- Casualty episode
- Episode no.: Series 33; Episode 1
- Directed by: Steve Brett
- Written by: Simon Norman
- Original air date: 11 August 2018
- Running time: 51 minutes

Guest appearances
- Di Botcher as Jan Jenning; Max Parker as Alasdair "Base" Newman; Simona Zivkovska as Mia Bellis; Claire Lams as Kelly Shearwood; Elen Rhys as Jodie Salsmann; Leila Ayad as Shelly Collard; Alexander Newland as Jerome Coxley; Natalie Radmall-Quirke as Kimberley "Kim" Simson; Daniel Attwell as Jake Salsmann

Episode chronology
| ← Previous "Episode 44" | Next → "Episode 2" |
- Casualty series 33

Episode 1094 is the opening episode of the thirty-third series of the British medical drama television series Casualty, and the 1094th episode of the overall series. The episode was written by Simon Norman and directed by Steve Brett, and premiered on BBC One on 11 August 2018. The plot follows an accident which sees paramedic Iain Dean (Michael Stevenson) swerve his ambulance, containing paramedic Ruby Spark (Maddy Hill) and registrar Alicia Munroe (Chelsea Halfpenny), to avoid hitting a woman who jumped off a bridge, creating a multi-car pile up and a petrol tanker exploding. The episode was announced on 24 July 2018 via the show's Twitter account. The stunt, which heavily focuses on the show's paramedic crew, marks the beginning of the new series, which was billed as "The Year of the Paramedic". Planning for the crash took place over several months and ten different explosions were created to display the fireball explosion.

The episode features the death of regular character Sam Nicholls (Charlotte Salt), which was embargoed until transmission. After Salt told producers of her intentions to leave, they decided to embed her exit into the crash. The actress was surprised to be told that Sam would be killed off and found filming Sam's death upsetting. Filming for the episode took place between late April and early May 2018 with on-location filming taking place in Bristol and on the Road to Nowhere. A footbridge across the dual carriageway was constructed for the purpose of filming. Interior scenes of the ambulance crashing were filmed on a gimbal that was fitted to the ambulance. Episode 1094 was promoted through promotional trailers, as well as the Twitter hashtag "#Casualty3006". It was watched by 5.83 million viewers in a 28-day period, and received positive reviews from critics and fans alike: Sophie Dainty of Digital Spy dubbed the episode "one of its most dramatic episodes in a long time", while Amy Hunt of What's on TV described Sam's death scene as "heartbreakingly emotional".

== Plot ==
Paramedics Iain Dean (Michael Stevenson) and Ruby Spark (Maddy Hill) are called out to the flat of couple Mia Bellis (Simona Zivkovska) and Base Newman (Max Parker). Mia has told Base that she has overdosed on medication. Iain and Ruby fail to find any pill bottles and ask Mia if she is being honest; Mia tells Iain that she lied about overdosing, and that he does not care about her, and will not care about her or her mental health until it is too late. Then, a call comes in on Iain's radio about a woman suffering severe bleeding after being pushed through a door. Iain recognises the address of the injured casualty as Alicia Munroe (Chelsea Halfpenny) and tells Ruby that they need to leave. Ruby is sceptical about leaving Mia, but Iain tells Ruby not to question him.

After collecting Alicia, Iain drives her and Ruby down to the emergency department (ED) via the dual carriageway. As Iain is driving, he notices Mia standing on the bridge over the carriageway, preparing to jump. Mia jumps off the bridge and Iain swerves the ambulance to avoid hitting her. The ambulance flips on its side and obstructs the lanes of the carriageway. A fuel tanker containing butane swerves to avoid the ambulance, which in turn causes a huge pile-up.

At the ED, clinical lead Connie Beauchamp (Amanda Mealing) is informed of the crash. She tells paramedics Sam Nicholls (Charlotte Salt) and Jan Jenning (Di Botcher) that Iain and Ruby have been involved in the pile-up. Consultant Dylan Keogh (William Beck) is also sent out to the scene of the crash to help treat the injured. The trio arrive at the scene and begin looking after patients. Alicia and Ruby are freed from the ambulance. Iain treats Mia and after stabilising her, sends Ruby to the ED with her. As Sam and Jan free their final two patients from the car trapped under the fuel tanker, it ignites, and explodes. The force of the explosion slams Sam into the side of the ambulance.

Back the ED, Alicia is recovering from her injuries; her friend Ethan Hardy (George Rainsford) visits her and comforts her. Mia dies from her injuries and Iain is devastated. At the ambulance station, Sam falls forward in agony – her liver has been nicked by shrapnel. She stumbles to the ambulance to treat herself. Iain later finds Sam in the ambulance and continues to treat her, but he is too late, and Sam dies in his arms.

== Production ==
=== Conception and development ===
"It's an episode that hasn't cut corners, that's for sure. Everything, from the production values to the re-shoots to get that extra bit of detail, has been done. Money and time has been invested in it – and it kicks off the new series in quite some fashion I feel."

—Stevenson on episode 1094 (2018)

On 9 May 2018, Sophie Dainty of entertainment website Digital Spy reported that Casualty would broadcast a car crash and an explosion involving a petrol tanker in August. The Gazette Series billed the stunts as "one of the most expensive scenes ever made" for the series. Actress Charlotte Salt, who portrays paramedic Sam Nicholls in the series, confirmed that the stunt would mark the beginning of the show's thirty-third series, which series producer Lucy Raffety billed as "The Year of the Paramedic". Raffety said that the stunt would start the new series with a "bang". Salt described the episode as "a big dramatic episode" with a focus on the paramedics at work. She added that there was a positive atmosphere on-set. Official confirmation of the episode was announced on the show's Twitter account on 24 July 2018. The tweet stated that "the paramedic crew of Holby ED face their darkest day" in the episode. Dainty reported that the stunt would "rip through the heart of Holby". Advanced spoiler pictures from episode 1094 were released on 11 August. Dainty also predicted that "life in Holby may never be the same again".

Salt explained that there would be a greater focus on the "front line of the NHS" from this episode. The actress dubbed the episode "adrenaline-filled" and "quite intense". In an interview with Christine Lampard on chat show Lorraine, Salt likened the episode to a late night special, which explores the "gritty, dark side" of paramedic life. She also described episode 1094 as a "very emotional [and] high-adrenaline" episode which sees Sam and her former Army colleague, paramedic Iain Dean (Michael Stevenson), go "full circle" with their relationship and work together in a "high-stress environment". Stevenson billed the episode as "gripping", and told Allison Jones of Inside Soap that the events of the episode will alter Iain's life "forever". He commented, "Everything that happens in the episode adds another level of guilt and jeopardy to all the characters it affects." The actor added that the episode would "share stories, raise awareness and create drama at the same time".

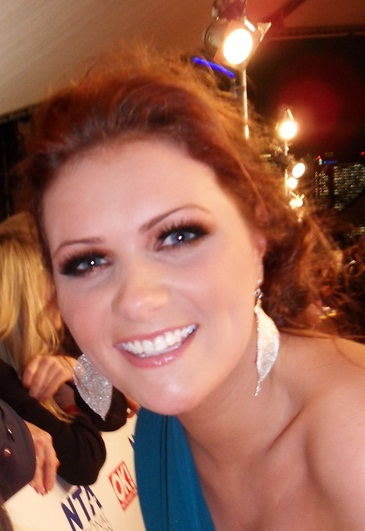
Registrar Alicia Munroe, portrayed by Chelsea Halfpenny (pictured), is heavily involved in the accident.

Episode 1094 begins 20 minutes before the end of the previous episode, although it is portrayed from an alternative viewpoint. At the end of the previous episode, Iain swerves the ambulance, which has Alicia and Ruby Spark (Maddy Hill) inside, but it is not known why he has done this. When the episode begins, Iain and Ruby are attending a call-out to suicidal Mia Bellis (Simona Zivkovska), but leave to attend an incident at Alicia's house. Stevenson told Elaine Reilly of What's on TV that his character's choice to treat Alicia Munroe (Chelsea Halfpenny) would cause the episode's events. He explained that in the moment, Iain felt that was the right decision to make. Jones (Inside Soap) reported that the aftermath of Iain's decision "proves devastating – and not just for Iain." Halfpenny enjoyed her character featuring as a patient in the episode, rather than a doctor, as she does not get the opportunity to do this often.

A petrol tanker crashes into the ambulance, creating a multi-car pile up on the dual carriageway. Stevenson explained that the people trapped in their cars at the incident scene cannot be saved quickly, placing them at risk. He said that the petrol tanker is "a ticking time bomb, adding pressure to the situation". He also stated that when the tanker explodes, it creates more chaos. To create the fireball that the tanker explodes into, the show's production team produced ten different explosions, which each served as a catalyst for the next explosion. The scene with the explosion was rehearsed multiple times without the explosion and the actors were told that when the camera starts filming, they should run and when they hear an explosion, they should duck. Stevenson confirmed that episode 1094 would spark a darker journey for Iain with issues that cannot be solved overnight.

Planning for episode 1094 took place over several months between the production team. To understand how the vehicles in the multi-car pile up would collide, members of the production team used model cars as examples. Mark Turner, the special effects coordinator, explained that the ambulance hits a pipe ramp on the dual carriageway, causing it to flip in an anti-clockwise position. The production team also faced a challenge in deciding how to crash and explode the petrol tanker. The episode was written by Simon Norman, directed by Steve Brett and produced by Carol Harding. Stevenson praised Brett's direction and likened the filming of episode 1094 to filming a movie. He pointed out that because Brett is "cinematic" in his work and since there was a lot of discussion about the characters and the scenes, there was a greater illusion that it was a movie. He commented, "In terms of the scale too, it very much felt like we were on movie standards." Raffety also praised Brett's direction, describing him as "unbelievable" and said that he managed to unite the cast and crew.

=== Salt's departure ===
The death of at least one regular character was revealed with the confirmation of the episode. Reilly (What's on TV) warned that the explosion would "kill indiscriminately". Duncan Lindsay, writing for the Metro, said that although it was "inevitable" that one character would die, producers were keeping the character's identity embargoed. Lindsay suggested that one of the show's paramedics could die. Similarly, Dainty included the paramedic crew in her list of potential deaths, but she also suggested that Alicia or Eddie McAllister (Joe Gaminara) could die too. She also thought that Bea Kinsella (Michelle Fox), who departed in the previous episode, could be a potential fatality. Stevenson told Reilly (What's on TV) that both patients and medics' lives would be placed in "jeopardy" by the explosion. He said, "you just don't know what's going to happen."

"Yes definitely, it's quite sad. There is a real finality to it rather than 'Oh well, I can always come back one day'. For me, personally and professionally, this way I can leave on a real high and move forward."

—Salt on her character being killed off. (2018)

Episode 1094 featured the death of Salt's character, Sam Nicholls. When Salt returned in 2017, she knew that she did not want to stay on the series for a long span. Producers wanted to create a sensational departure for Sam and decided to have the character leave during the crash. Salt explained that it seemed to be "the perfect moment to throw a real spanner in the works." Despite this, the actress was surprised to learn that her character would be killed off and felt that her exit was more final, allowing her to progress with her career. Salt hoped that the audience would be surprised by Sam's death and wanted it to have a "big impact" as she felt that most twists were normally spoilt ahead of transmission.

As Sam and Iain save two women trapped in the crash, the tanker explodes and they are hit by the explosion without injury. However, later in the ambulance depot, Sam discovers that she has been hit by shrapnel causing her liver to bleed. She collapses in an ambulance and when Iain finds her, she says goodbye to him and dies. The scene where Sam dies was first scene of the episode to be filmed, which Salt found weird. She found it upsetting to film Sam's death scene as it solidified that it was the end of a character that has been "a huge part of [her] life." Stevenson described Sam's death as "shocking and upsetting" and said that Iain would blame himself in the aftermath. Salt explained that Sam's death would take Iain to "a very dark place", which has never been explored before.

=== Filming ===
The episode was filmed between late April and early May 2018. Cast and crew were allowed six weeks to produce the episode, two extra weeks than allowed for a regular episode. On-location filming was held at three different locations in Bristol, England. One of the three locations was an unused dual carriageway, the Road to Nowhere, in Yate, England which is closed to traffic. The show received permission from South Gloucestershire Council to film on the dual carriageway. Casualty has previously filmed at the location for other episodes. Stevenson dubbed the location as "phenomenal" and found himself amazed by the set. He likened the set to walking into a film and thought that the set designers had produced an amazing set.

The show planned to film on the Road to Nowhere between 28 April and 5 May, although filming took longer than originally thought and continued until 10 May. Stevenson explained that the stunts for episode could not be hurried and therefore, they took more time. He added that extra days were given to ensure that they had everything that they needed. Shooting for the episode took place at night, which Salt and Di Botcher (paramedic Jan Jenning actress) disliked but Stevenson enjoyed. Stevenson enjoyed the night shoots, but found it difficult to cheer Salt up. Salt told Dainty (Digital Spy) that although she found the night shoots tiring, "there is such a camaraderie that you all find at 2am when you're worrying that the sun is going to come up soon and you've got to get the last shot in." A footbridge was constructed by the show's set designers for the episode. Stevenson was surprised by how realistic the footbridge was.

All the interior scenes of the ambulance flipping and being hit were filmed on a gimbal that was fitted to the ambulance. Halfpenny and Hill were involved in these scenes, with Halfpenny strapped to a bed in the ambulance. When the ambulance was on its side, Halfpenny hung from the bed, which she and Hill found amusing. The show's crew had to regularly check that the actresses were fine and that neither had whiplash.

== Promotion and broadcast ==
External videos
- "End of the Road"; An official trailer for the episode
- "Episode 1 (Preview Clip #1)"; A preview clip for the episode
- "Episode 1 (Preview Clip #2)"; A preview clip for the episode

On 4 August 2018, after the broadcast of episode 1093, a trailer for the episode was released. The trailer, called "End of the Road", was used to promote the episode. A 30-second preview clip from the episode was released on 10 August, with a second preview clip released on 11 August. The show's social media team used the Twitter hashtag "#Casualty3006" to promote the episode. They also produced a countdown to the episode, ranging from five days until broadcast to when the episode began airing.

At time of the episode's initial announcement, it was stated that the episode would air in August 2018. On 24 July 2018, it was confirmed that the episode would air on 11 August. The episode premiered on BBC One at 21:10 and was available to watch on BBC iPlayer for thirty days after its broadcast.

== Reception ==
Official ratings from the Broadcasters' Audience Research Board showed that 5.51 million people had watched the episode on BBC One and BBC iPlayer within 7 days of the original broadcast. Within 28 days of the original broadcast, viewership for episode 1094 increased to 5.83 million, making it the most-watched programme on BBC One for its week of transmission. The episode was the twelfth most-watched programme in August 2018.

The ambulance crash and motorway pile-up was nominated for Best Soap Stunt at the 2018 Digital Spy Reader Awards; it came in fifth place with 10.7% of the total votes. Sam's death came in ninth place in the "Biggest OMG Soap moment" and "Most devastating soap death" categories with 4.4% and 3.5% of the total votes respectively.

Dainty (Digital Spy) described episode 1094 as "unmissable" and called the crash "catastrophic", and a "horror". After the episode aired, Dainty said that it was "one of its most dramatic episodes in a long time". Dainty's colleague, Sam Warner, noted that viewers were kept "completely shocked" throughout the episode. Reilly (What's on TV) dubbed the episode's stunt "ambitious". Jones (Inside Soap) labelled the episode "heart-stopping" and was not surprised that Casualty made a big effort with it. Phil Norris, writing for the Gloucestershire Live, opined that the episode was "dramatic" and found the stunt shocking. Norris pointed out that the audience were excited for the episode to begin. Lindsay (Metro) pointed out that the episode "starts with a bang – and ends in tragedy." In a review for the episode, Alison Graham, writing for the Radio Times, opined that episode 1094 was very emotional and warned readers to "brace [themselves]". She noted that "in Casualty, every action has consequences, and usually they are as dire as can be." On the pre-opening titles scene, which she liked, Graham commented, "It's immediately obvious that all is not well in the Holby hospital ambulance station, which is eerily quiet, save for the ringing of a solitary, discarded, mobile phone..."

Amy Hunt, writing for What's on TV, described Sam's death scene as "heartbreakingly emotional" and "difficult and emotional". She described the acting as "stellar". Hunt also pointed out that viewers were left "shocked" and "upset" by the character's exit. Susannah Alexander from Digital Spy thought that Sam was "brutally" killed in the explosion. Sarah Ellis of Inside Soap wrote of the episode, "The latest episode was even more dramatic - I can't believe poor Sam is dead. Sob!"
