= Jan Jenning =

Casualty character

- Casualty character
- Di Botcher as Jan Jenning
- First appearance: Episode 1084; 19 May 2018
- Portrayed by: Di Botcher
- Duration: 2018–

In-universe information
- Occupation: Paramedic; Operational duty manager
- Family: Gaynor Gowan (sister); Theodore "Teddy" Gowan (nephew)
- Spouses: Gethin West (backstory; divorced); Ffion Morgan
- Children: Ross West

Jan Jenning is a fictional character from the BBC medical drama Casualty, portrayed by actress Di Botcher. She first appears in the thirty-fifth episode of the thirty-second series, first broadcast on 19 May 2018. The character was created as part of the show's focus on its paramedic team, which takes hold in series 33, dubbed the "Year of the Paramedic". Jan is characterised as the strong, no-nonsense and experienced operational duty manager at Holby Ambulance Service whose steely exterior hides a caring, motherly nature. Many of Jan's stories have revolved around her relationships with other characters, particularly as a leader within the paramedic team.

The character's first major story explored her backstory through the introduction of her drug dealer son, Ross West (Chris Gordon). Writers at first withheld their connection. Jan and Ross' relationship creates tension between Jan and Iain Dean (Michael Stevenson), whose friend overdosed after being supplied drugs from Ross. He is eventually arrested and producers then introduced Jan's police officer wife Ffion Morgan (Stirling Gallacher) with the two demonstrating contrasting aspects to Jan's life. Their marriage is portrayed as strong and healthy but was challenged by the return of Ross, who gets Jan to smuggle drugs into prison for him. Writers heightened the story by having Ffion attacked and incorporating Iain's return into the plot. Botcher hoped the audience understood Jan's reasoning behind her actions, but worried some viewers may stop liking her.

A special episode, "Thin Green Lane", focusing on the pressures faced by Jan and her team aired in 2022. The documentary-style episode was improvised and actors devised their own dialogue. Executive producer Jon Sen placed Jan at the forefront of the episode and highlighted her as a leader struggling under immense pressure. Jan's next story introduces her former husband, Gethin West (Robert Pugh), and tackled the subjects of motor neurone disease (MND) and assisted suicide. Scriptwriters received support from charities, the MND Association and Dying with Dignity, to accurately portray the story and portray a balanced view on the topics. When Gethin's MND worsens rapidly, he asks Jan to help him end his life. Writers portray Jan's turmoil at deciding whether to help Gethin, but conclude the story in a special single-strand two-hander episode set in Switzerland, where Gethin attends an assisted dying clinic.

The character and Botcher's performances were well received by television critics and viewers alike. For her role as Jan, Botcher won the Drama Performance award at the 2024 Royal Television Society Cymru Awards. Sen called Jan "one of [the show's] most popular paramedics". The assisted dying story was applauded by critics and charities, with Elaine Reilly of TVTimes calling it "a poignant and intimate exploration of a difficult subject in expert hands with Di Botcher and Robert Pugh". The two-hander episode was submitted as part of Casualty's nomination for the British Academy Television Award for Best Soap and Continuing Drama in 2024, which they won.

== Casting ==
In September 2017, Lucy Raffety, the new series producer of Casualty, told Sophie Dainty from Digital Spy that she wanted to increase the focus on the show's paramedic team. As the only medical drama featuring paramedics, Raffety felt it important to reflect the role, having been inspired by documentary series Ambulance and An Hour To Save Your Life. In a March 2018 interview with Emma Bullimore from TV Times, Raffety announced that actress Di Botcher had been cast in the role of Jan Jenning. The character was created in preparation for the show's focus on its paramedic team, which takes hold in series 33, dubbed the "Year of the Paramedic". Maddy Hill was also cast as paramedic Ruby Spark as part of the efforts.

Botcher was excited to join the cast. She told Sarah Ellis from Inside Soap that she was "thrilled" to be considered for the role of a paramedic as she never considered playing a paramedic herself. The actress felt welcomed by her all of her co-stars, even those who she was not filming opposite. Botcher previously appeared in the show in the series 16 episode "Life Incognito" as Louise Templeton. The actress enjoyed her experience of filming the guest role and said it remained a strong memory for her. Charlotte Salt, who portrays Sam Nicholls on the show, was excited about Botcher's casting, having been a fan of hers. She thought that Botcher would be "just the comic relief that Casualty really needs and viewers enjoy".

== Development ==
=== Characterisation and introduction ===
Jan has been in the service for years – she's been there, done that and got 12 t-shirts to boot. There is very little that surprises her now... Known across Holby for her no nonsense attitude (and that's putting it nicely) Jan is the Mother Hen of the Ambulance Service. Firm and sometimes fair, once you've proved yourself to Jan, you can bet she will back you to the ends of the earth. Jan knows people make mistakes, but all that matters to her is if you did your best.

— An excerpt from Jan's profile on the official Casualty website.

Jan is characterised as the strong, no-nonsense and loyal operational duty manager at Holby Ambulance Service. She is dubbed the "Mother Hen of the Ambulance Service". Jan is described as a "firm and sometimes fair" yet "cynical" person who is impressed by people doing their best. She is billed as "bold, brash and bossy", but very protective of her own team. Botcher called her character "brave, loyal and funny". Jan has a practical mindset and does not suffer fools gladly. Despite her tough exterior, she is a caring person. Dainty of Digital Spy described Jan as a "no-nonsense" and "pragmatic" woman who appears to be a "tough cookie" but is actually "a bit of a softie inside". Botcher liked her character's pragmatism; she commented, "She's got a sort of earthiness to her, a practicality and a warmth." She thought her loyalty made her someone who she would be friends with her in real life. The actress likened Jan to "a human bulldog" because she is "determined, tenacious and single-minded". She added that she is a "guarded" person. On Jan's feisty nature, Botcher opined, "Jan's got a very big heart and a lot of compassion, but she can go up like a rocket!" Jan's powerful personality comes as a shock to her new colleagues. She has been labelled an "unconventional" boss who makes an impact. Botcher opined that Jan feels confident to warn her team and "come down hard on them" because she views them like a family.

The character is established as an experienced paramedic, which has allowed her to build a wealth of knowledge. This assists Jan in deciding how to effectively treat her patients without doubt and how to identify any time wasters. Botcher characterised Jan as "a capable, caring woman, who believes in public service, and she'll go above and beyond for her patients and fellow paramedics". Through her years of experience, Jan has witnessed the various changes within the National Health Service (NHS) and has been able to keep up with the technological advances of the profession without issue. Jan is portrayed as an opinionated woman. In her eyes, the paperwork and "box ticking" exercises are the "root cause of why the NHS is struggling". Botcher enjoyed portraying a paramedic and revealed that her experience inspired her to complete a first aid training course. She liked having a balance of filming in the studio and on location, as this allows permits her to work with guest artists and the main cast alike. In particular, Botcher was a fan of working on the set of the ambulance station and called it their "home". Portraying a paramedic gave Botcher access to advice from a real-life paramedic on-set, which she appreciated as it gave the opportunity to learn as she worked. She admired the real-life paramedics and did not believe she would be capable of being a paramedic herself.

Jan is introduced in the show's 1084th episode, which is within the thirty-second series, broadcast on 19 May 2018. Her debut was publicised in a promotional trailer released on 16 March 2018. The character's first scenes involve her making "her presence known" with her new colleagues, Sam and Iain. Jan has to assert her authority quickly after they amputate a teenager's leg on a callout. This causes her to clash with Sam. Salt explained that her character becomes "really frustrated" about the treatment of her in the situation. In her early episodes, Jan is part of a stunt which Botcher deemed "impressive". She appreciated having a team of real paramedics on-set during the stunts as it helped ensure her portrayal was accurate.

Shortly after her introduction, Jan and the other paramedics are given focus through the show's "Year of the Paramedic" theme. This focus begins with Sam's death and follows the team through their grief. Raffety wanted to explore how they deal with the sudden nature of Sam's death as well as "the pressure of a front line job". Through the paramedic characters, Raffety and Simon Harper, the show's executive producer, hoped to reflect the outbreak of mental health issues within paramedics, which she found unsurprising considering they are often the first responders to "quite horrific situations".

=== Relationships ===
Writers explored Jan's relationships with other characters in the show. She is established as an old friend of nurse Duffy (Cathy Shipton). Botcher told Ellis (Inside Soap) that Duffy finds Jan "outrageous" and amusing. The actress filmed her first scene on the show with Shipton. Jan was also connected to original character Charlie Fairhead (Derek Thompson), who is Duffy's husband. A "love-hate relationship" was created for the pair. The character's primary interactions are with paramedics Sam Nicholls and Iain Dean (Michael Stevenson). Their relationship is explored in Jan's early episodes. Botcher explained that Jan quickly recognises that Iain and Sam are valuable assets to her team. Salt dubbed Jan as "the third point to the triangle" in the paramedic team. She thought it created "a really nice balance". The softer side of Jan's personality was showcased when Ruby Spark (Hill) is introduced as a new paramedic. Hill noted how Jan acts like "a mother hen" and recognises that Ruby is well-intentioned, so wants her to be included in the team. Raffety thought that the paramedic team formed a "slightly dysfunctional paramedic family". Botcher enjoyed working within the paramedic team and on the ambulance station set.

A new paramedic, Fenisha Khatri (Olivia D'Lima), was introduced in 2020. As part of the paramedic team, Jan and Fenisha share many scenes together. D'Lima enjoyed working with Botcher and admitted that they had nicknames for each other. Writers used Jan's relationship with Fenisha to highlight how Jan has struggled with Iain's depression and suicide attempt. Botcher told Elaine Reilly of What to Watch that watching Iain's risky behaviour "aged Jan" and she does not want to see Fenisha follow the same path. Jan and Fenisha share a "fraught" relationship and frequently clash. Whilst Jan prefers to follow the rules and work together, Fenisha is "action-loving" and acts without thinking, something which often creates more work for Jan. Despite this, Botcher thought that her character did like Fenisha because she has "potential". In one scenario, Fenisha disobeys Jan's instructions to wait for the fire service before saving a man trapped under stage rigging. When Fenisha injures herself, Jan is furious and reprimands her, handing her an official warning. Fenisha fights back against the decision, which enrages Jan. D'Lima explained that Fenisha is feeling "a lot of hurt and anger" by Jan's decision. Botcher felt that this argument solidified Jan's reasons for being wary of Fenisha. She added that it encourages Jan to be "on the lookout" for Fenisha not following the rules. D'Lima enjoyed filming scenes of conflict with Botcher because they had fun between shooting scenes.

An episode featuring a stunt involving Jan and Fenisha was planned to progress their relationship. The stunt was filmed across a week in March 2020, prior to the COVID-19 lockdown, inside an underground tunnel. Botcher enjoyed filming the episode, but disliked the poor weather conditions. In the episode, Jan is on annual leave and uses this time to lead a youth club on a walk through an old railway tunnel. Botcher enjoyed seeing her character in a different context and liked that she was "someone who puts back into society". She liked being able to explore one of Jan's passions and a more upbeat side to the character. When the tunnel collapses and the group become trapped, Fenisha is called to the shout and is surprised to find Jan with the group. The pair have to work together to rescue the teenagers, which Jan finds tricky. Botcher explained that Jan views Fenisha as "flibbertigibbet" because she struggles waiting to work with others. After rescuing the teenagers, Jan confesses to Fenisha that she has a serious injury and is worried. Botcher told Reilly that Jan believes that she is tough but actually has "a well of deep emotion". She added that the audience "see Jan as [they've] never seen her before". Jan and Fenisha then have a heart-to-heart, where Jan admits that she is hard on Fenisha because she sees her potential and Fenisha reveals that she is four months pregnant. Jan survives the accident and is seen in hospital afterwards, which Botcher enjoyed filming.

In 2021, Fenisha was killed off in a car crash. Writers explored the impact that this has on Jan as she struggles with her colleague's death. Botcher explained that Jan tries to "bury her feelings" in the aftermath because she feels responsible for protecting her team. Following the exits of Fenisha and Lev Malinovsky (Uriel Emil), a new paramedic character was created: Theodore "Teddy" Gowan (Milo Clarke). Teddy is established as Jan's nephew, developing a new dynamic within the paramedic team. Clarke enjoyed working with Botcher, who he felt that he was learning from, and liked the "little paramedic family" that had been established. Teddy is excitable and enthusiastic to begin his new job, which grates with a grieving Jan. Botcher explained that Teddy is "the last person [Jan] wants on her team" because she is constantly worried about her team's safety in the light of Fenisha and Lev's deaths. Jan's anxiety takes form over many episodes as she pushes Teddy away at work. This comes to a head in a special episode focusing on the paramedic team. In the scenario, Jan and Teddy work together as they attend to a vulnerable patient. They unknowingly eat cannabis brownies and Teddy is attacked by a drug dealer. The situation becomes "extremely stressful" for Jan as she finds herself conflicted between being an aunt and a leader. She manages to save Teddy and opens up about her feelings. Botcher confirmed that Jan and Teddy would build a strong relationship as they continued to work together.

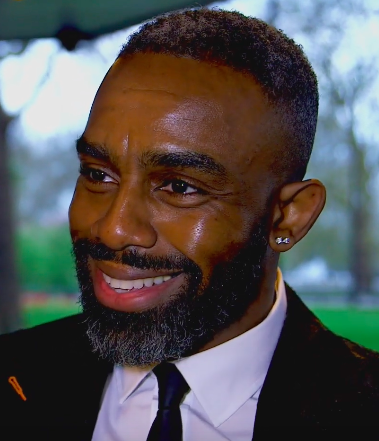
Writers explored Jan's friendship with Jacob Masters, portrayed by Charles Venn (pictured).

Writers later place attention on Jan's friendship with paramedic Jacob Masters (Charles Venn) after his newborn grandson is placed in his care. The story forms part of the series' focus on mental health struggles and seeking support. Jacob struggles to manage his professional duties with the responsibility of caring for his grandson Carter, so Jan tries to help him by offering him somewhere to live. The pair then work together to care for Carter. Venn explained that Jacob is grateful for Jan's support and recognises that without her, he could not manage all his responsibilities. The story develops to focus on Jacob searching for his missing son and Carter's father, Blake Gardner (David Ajayi). Jacob is asked to identify a body matching Blake's description, which Jan accompanies him for. Venn called Jan "a pillar of strength for Jacob in his hour of need". The actor enjoyed sharing the scenes with Botcher.

A new student paramedic, Indie Jankowski (Naomi Wakszlak), was introduced in 2025. Jan initially clashes with Indie as she "[gets] off on the wrong foot" with Jan. Roxanne Harvey, the show's executive producer, wanted to explore Indie's growth as a paramedic through her relationship with Jan. Indie joins the paramedic team on placement under Jan's leadership. At university, she fails her cardiac-care module and lies to Jan about this. Wakszlak felt that the audience first supported Jan as Indie appeared "spiky", but soon realised that there was more depth to Indie. Jan hires Indie to work in the ambulance control centre. Writers explored the pressures of this role for Jan as she experiences a performance review. Indie tries to support by breaking protocol to meet targets. Jan learns that Indie is homeless and invites her to stay with her. Botcher told an Inside Soap reporter that Jan would enjoy "taking in waifs and strays in her ever-expanding house!" The relationship between Jan and Indie sours when Indie allows her estranged father, Martin Jankowski (Martin Hancock), to burgle Jan's home. Writers explored the twist through the impact it has on the paramedic team as Iain decides to leave the team. Stevenson explained that the team is now "so fractured" and filled with "conflict". Jan informs Indie that there is not a job for her when she graduates, so Iain intervenes and tries to defend Indie. Jan remains firm and insists that "a fresh start would be better for everyone".

=== Exploration of backstory ===
The character's first major story focuses on the exploration of her backstory through the introduction of her son, Ross West (Chris Gordon). Botcher was surprised to learn that her character had a son, but was excited by the decision to explore her character's backstory. She hoped it would allow viewers to understand Jan better and sympathise with her, as up until this point, Jan had been "a closed book" with a very private home life. The character's backstory states that her husband was "a nasty man" who left the family when Ross was a teenager. This led to Ross rebelling and becoming involved with "a bad bunch" of people. Botcher described Ross as "a thorn in Jan's side for years" and recognised that the relationship between them was strained. Ross was first introduced in September 2018 as the drug dealer supplying Base Newman (Max Parker), who is friends with Iain. At a similar time, Jan is seen acting mysteriously and sending money to an unknown person, which is later revealed to be Ross. Producers deliberately withheld the link between Jan and Ross until months later to create a surprise for the audience.

The reveal takes place when Jan is called out to attend a drug overdose and finds Iain with Base, who is dead, and Ross, who is unconscious after being attacked. Botcher explained that Jan struggles to act professionally in that moment and her first concern is that her son may be a drug addict. She added, "She's doing her best as a paramedic, and as a mother - although it's very tough..." Iain informs Jan that he attacked Ross because he is the drug dealer who gave Base a lethal dose, but she refuses to believe this. Botcher told Allison Jones of Inside Soap that her character is "blinkered" and believes that Ross has "got in with a bad crowd". When Ross wakes up in the ED, he deflects against Iain's allegations and claims that Iain has been harassing Base for months. In the ED, Iain tries to prove Ross' guilt to Jan by searching his belongings. Jan finds Iain doing this and wrongly thinks that he is attacking Ross again, so she reports him to the police. Botcher felt this was a "knee-jerk reaction rather than a considered opinion" and that Jan was acting out of anger. Iain is then arrested for assaulting Ross, which adds to the character's growing depression. Stevenson explained that Jan is loyal towards Ross and has "no reason to believe Iain", especially considering his recent troubles. Back at the hospital, an x-ray reveals that Ross has swallowed the drugs he had hidden, leading to his arrest.

"It's a good, healthy relationship. They have a lot of fun, they don't row a lot. They're both clear, solid women, who love each other very much. They've been together for a long time, and I think they have built a very constructive relationship built on trust and love."

— Gallacher on Jan and Ffion's marriage (2020).

Producers revisited the story in 2020 with Ross' return and the introduction of Jan's wife, Ffion Morgan (Stirling Gallacher). The plot was billed as "huge and terrifying". Ffion is a police officer, which was used to create contrast between her and Ross. Harper teased that the situation would become "pretty turbulent". He was excited to explore the character of Ffion following her mention during Ross' initial appearance. Harper was excited to watch Botcher and Gallacher working together to portray the characters' marriage. Gallacher enjoyed filming with Botcher and looked forward to working with her more. Ffion's introduction to the show was delayed by the show's transmission breaks, which were caused by the COVID-19 pandemic. Jan and Ffion's shared backstory states that they have a healthy relationship. Gallacher described their marriage as "a very constructive relationship built on trust and love". She opined that Jan and Ffion are "both clear, solid women, who love each other very much".

Writers created an insight into the couple's marriage in Ffion's first episode as they celebrate their wedding anniversary. Jan forgets about the occasion and claims to have booked a meal for that evening, before spending the day trying to organise one. Work soon takes over for Jan and she has to cancel any evening plans. Although Jan becomes stressed about the situation, Gallacher recognised that "subconsciously Jan is secure that it won't be a deal-breaker for Ffion". When they talk to each other, Ffion is understanding and forgives Jan. Gallacher told Ellis (Inside Soap) that the pair's careers mean that sometimes they become over involved in their work, which they both recognise as it is a "human" thing to do.

=== Drug smuggling ===
A new story for Jan was devised as part of series 35. Loretta Preece, the then-series producer, teased that the story would take Jan and Ffion into "totally new territory". The story is set up through the return of Ross, which had been delayed by the pandemic, and follows Jan being emotionally blackmailed to smuggle drugs into prison. Botcher admitted that she was surprised when she learnt about the story and initially did not believe it was consistent with Jan's characterisation. She felt that the plot damaged the "strong moral core" that Jan has become known for. However, Botcher recognised that although this is something Jan "never, ever, thought she'd do", she does it because she loves her son. She explained that Ross is Jan's "Achilles' heel" and she is "hopeless over him". Botcher hoped that the audience would understand Jan's reasoning, but predicted that some viewers may not like her character after this. On how she coped with portraying the storyline, the actress told Hannah Davies of TVTimes that it was "like a huge weight on [her] shoulders" and she struggled to detach herself from it. Despite initially having reservations about the plot, Botcher later named it her favourite storyline. She enjoyed the "dilemma Jan had to deal with" and portraying her relationships with Ross and Ffion.

Ross is admitted into hospital after being injured in prison, so Jan visits him and is surprised from the prison guard that he has been well behaved. Ross soon reveals to Jan that he injured himself because other prisoners are threatening him into drug smuggling. He explains that they know Jan is a paramedic and want her to supply them to protect him. Jan agrees to smuggle drugs into the prison and steals the drugs from a dead patient. Jan spends the day awaiting a call from Ross with instructions. Botcher told Ellis (Inside Soap) that Jan feels frightened and "sick to her stomach" every time she receives a phone call. To facilitate Jan being permitted into the prison, another prisoner is attacked. When she enters, Jan leaves inexperienced paramedic Leon Cook (Bobby Lockwood) to treat the patient while she plants the drugs in the cell. Botcher described Jan's actions as "illegal and unethical". The actress had to wear full personal protective equipment (PPE) for filming inside the prison set, challenging Botcher when portraying Jan's fear. However, the director opined that she managed to convey the emotion well through the "absolute terror from [her] eyes".

Writers used Jan's drug smuggling to challenge her marriage to Ffion. Ffion begins to suspect that something is wrong with Jan. Botcher explained that Jan does not feel able to confide in Ffion as she has a strong "moral code". She added that Ffion dislikes Ross and would not be "very sympathetic to listening" about him. Whilst she and Jan are out together, Ffion is attacked by a masked man, who also hands Jan a burner phone from Ross. It becomes apparent that Jan is expected to smuggle drugs again for Ross and he instructs her via a phone call. Producers reintroduced Iain after an 18-month absence; he returns during this story. Stevenson was excited about working with Botcher again and said it felt like he'd "never been away". The new developments in the story were promoted using a trailer released in April 2021. As Jan is hiding the drugs in a prison cell, she is caught by Iain. Botcher described Jan as feeling "ashamed" when Iain catches her. Stevenson told Dainty from Digital Spy that Jan is "in the depths of despair" and feels "desperate".

Iain's return created a confidant for Jan as he agrees to help her with the situation. Botcher pointed out that prior to this, Jan has been "lying to everyone and wading into her own personal hell". Stevenson said that although Iain is stunned to learn about Jan's involvement, he is prepared to "stand by her side". Iain initially feels conflicted as the situation involves Ross, but he knows how much Jan loves her son, so prepares to support her. On this, Stevenson commented, "There's no question - Iain will stand by her side to see her through this. Jan has always been there for him." In supporting Jan with her problems, Iain visits Ross in prison; this marks the first time they have seen each other since Base died. Stevenson told Reilly (TVTimes) that his character is only concerned with "standing by Jan and getting her out of the awful situation she's in".

The story reaches its conclusion when Jan decides to confess to drug smuggling after it begins to take a toll on her mental wellbeing. Botcher told Reilly, writing for What's on TV, that Jan is "literally at breaking point and believes confessing is the only way out..." Jan becomes worried about Ffion's safety following her recent attack. Botcher explained that Ffion believes she was a victim of hate crime and Jan cannot tell her the truth, which is "eating her up". As they are out walking, a motorbike innocently drives near the couple, causing Jan to panic. This causes Jan to doubt herself and Ffion to start asking questions. When Iain learns about Jan's plans to confess, he decides to visit Ross and ask for his help. Botcher pointed out that Iain has to "reason with this person he despises". The plot concludes with Ross confessing to smuggling the drugs and Jan deciding to cut him off. Writers then set up a new development for the character as Ffion learns the truth about the drug smuggling and her attack. Botcher explained that going forwards, it appears that Jan has lost both Ffion and Ross from her life. She added, "Jan has to live with the consequences of her actions..."

=== Marital problems ===
Producers used the conclusion of the drug smuggling plot to begin a new story exploring Jan's marriage to Ffion. Botcher assessed that her character's home life was in a "pretty shoddy" place in the wake of Ffion learning the truth. Preece confirmed that the couple's marriage would be "certainly pushed to its limits" over series 36. In light of her involvement with Ross, Jan is ejected from the marital home by Ffion. She moves in with Iain and avoids looking for somewhere long-term to live as she thinks she will repair her marriage. Writers used Teddy's introduction to add an extra element to Jan and Ffion's separation. As Jan's nephew, Teddy learns about the problems and "brings her misery to the surface". Botcher was excited to be exploring Jan and Ffion's marriage further, but believed they had more challenges to face before they achieved happiness.

The strain on Jan and Ffion's marriage is emphasised when Ffion is hospitalised after an accident and gives Jan the "cold shoulder" when she visits. Ffion is treated by Dylan Keogh (William Beck), who reveals that she may have breast cancer. Jan suggests to Ffion that she move back into their home so she can support her. However, Ffion rebuffs Jan's suggestion and reminds her that she is not forgiven. Jan and Ffion's martial problems come to a climax when they are involved in a hostage situation together. They see each other whilst attending a call out to an injured security guard, where Ffion reveals that she has contacted a divorce lawyer. Writers created a dramatic scenario when their patient holds Jan, Ffion and another man at gunpoint and Ffion is shot. They share their histories with the patient in a bid to defuse the situation and it allows them to speak about the current state of their marriage. Ffion then realises that she wants to reunite with Jan and they agree to try again.

=== "Thin Green Line" ===
A special episode, "Thin Green Line" focusing on Jan and the paramedic team was devised for December 2022. It explores the pressures that the team are facing and the impact of ambulance queues. Jon Sen, the show's executive producer, explained that he wanted to "tell a story that gets as close as possible to what it is like to stand in the shoes of paramedics". He added that he wanted the audience to develop a greater appreciation for paramedics and their work. Producers designed the episode to be improvised with the actors devising their own dialogue. It was filmed in a documentary format, which director Steve Hughes hoped would give it "a grounded, naturalistic feel". The show's story team researched improvisation techniques to decide how to best portray the struggles faced by paramedics. The episode was promoted in a trailer released on 7 December 2022, three days before broadcast.

The script only contained a synopsis of each scene without lines, so actors had to devise their own lines and improvise their responses to their co-stars. The main cast did not meet the episode's guest artists until they shot the scenes, allowing them to respond authentically. Hughes revealed that the actors found the concept of improvisation scary and compared it to "walking a tightrope without a net". The cast and crew were given additional rehearsal time to prepare for each scene. Despite this, each scene still varied slightly due to its improvised nature. Prior to starting production on the episode, Hughes arranged for the four cast members portraying the paramedics to have an improvisation session so they would feel more at ease with filming. Clarke explained that this made the actors realise they could trust each other. The cast were given longer to film each take of the episode. Clarke felt this allowed the cast to "really understand how it felt to be a paramedic". Laura Johnson, a paramedic and advisor to the show, initially found the concept of the episode nerve-wracking, but later described it as "genius". She believed that there were many moments within the episode which would elicit many different emotional responses from the audience.

Set across four days, the episode follows each paramedic on their shifts. Jan's story sees her returning from holiday and becoming "ground down" by work, ending with her making a big mistake. Botcher played a main role in the episode and her character is "pushed to the limit". Sen explained that he chose to place Jan at the forefront of the episode because she is "an incredible leader" and has the backstory to support witnessing big change in the ambulance service. He commented, "She portrays a character who's been in the paramedic service for a significant number of years." Writers played on Jan's backstory and included a scene whereby she reflects on the changes. One of the episode's themes is the impact of budget cuts to NHS fundings. Writers created a speech for Jan to illustrate the impact the cuts have on the paramedics. When a social media influencer complains about wait times, Jan "snaps" at her and explains they are trying to help. Botcher told Nicola Methvan from the Daily Mirror that she wanted viewers to appreciate the "person behind the uniform" and how there is "ordinary people doing extraordinary things".

Writers pair Jan with Sah Brockner (Arin Smethurst), the newest member of the paramedic team, across the four shifts. They have a tricky relationship and often clash, but this changes across the episode. Smethurst explained that Sah recognises how much Jan is struggling and tries to help her by encouraging her to take time off work. They added, "It becomes not so tense anymore and there is a lot more understanding between them in the aftermath." Smethurst enjoyed working with Botcher on the episode and called her "a brilliant performer". The episode concludes with Jan reversing the ambulance and hitting a pedestrian, before returning home to Ffion and breaking down. Smethurst thought the ending would "hit people quite hard" and admitted that she found it shocking. Sen wanted to use the ending to highlight Jan as a struggling leader who "ends up falling foul of a mistake herself". Producers used "Thin Green Line" as a springboard into exploring Jan's struggles, both domestically and professionally. Sen told Lewis Knight from Radio Times that although Jan priorities the wellbeing of her team, it is actually Jan who "suffers under the pressures".

=== Assisted dying ===
In 2023, producers cast Robert Pugh in the role of Gethin West, Jan's former husband. Their shared backstory states that they were married for 20 years and that Gethin is an alcoholic. The character was used to explore the issue of motor neuron disease (MND) after he receives a diagnosis. The show's story team contacted the MND Association for support with portraying the story. They supported scriptwriters through advice and reviewing scripts as well as directing them to specialist nurses who could assist. The story progresses and Gethin eventually decides to visit an assisted dying clinic in Switzerland to end his life. The show's story team worked with assisted suicide charity, Dying with Dignity, to accurately portray the plot. A show spokesperson confirmed that they wanted the story to highlight the issue's "complexity" and portray a balanced view on assisted suicide.

Gethin is introduced when Jan attends a shout to treat a drunk, homeless man and is shocked to realise it is him. Jan treats Gethin but they bicker on their way to the hospital. At the ED, Jan is surprised to discover she is Gethin's next of kin and that he has nowhere to live. After learning that Gethin has been diagnosed with MND, Jan invites him to live with her and Ffion. She does not initially tell Ffion, which creates problems for the pair's marriage. Writers explored the impact of MND over multiple episodes as Gethin's condition worsens and he struggles to cope. Gethin eventually decides he wants to kill himself rather than deteriorate slowly. Jan struggles with this and encourages him to change his mind by taking him on a "nostalgic" trip to the seaside. The actors filmed the scenes on-location. The day proves tiring for Gethin and further emphasises his choice.

After portraying Jan as disapproving of Gethin's choice, writers shifted Jan's opinion after she treats a terminally ill patient. Jan then agrees to help Gethin die. The decision challenges Jan's characterisation and her beliefs. A show insider told Ellis (Inside Soap) that the idea "doesn't sit right with her", but she her desire to help Gethin overrides it. Jan provides Gethin with the fatal medication, stolen from a dead patient, so that he can kill himself while she is at work. At work, Jan remains "on edge and emotional". A plot twist was created when Jan returns home to find Gethin alive and Ffion aware of the plan. This puts a strain on Jan and Ffion's marriage and they separate, although Ffion eventually agrees to support Gethin. She arranges for him to attend an assisted dying clinic in Switzerland. On the day of their flight to Switzerland, Jan is delayed at work and nearly misses the flight.

The story culminates in a special single-strand two-hander episode set in Switzerland as Gethin attends an assisted dying clinic. Despite being set in Switzerland, the show did not film abroad. The episode follows Jan and Gethin meeting a doctor from the clinic, before enjoying a final day together. Gethin arranges a picnic for them as he wants to create "some happy memories for Jan to hold onto". To accurately portray Gethin's MND, Pugh insisted that his character must only speak when necessary, so Michelle Lipton, the episode's writer, cut half of his planned dialogue. Botcher and Pugh had to instead convey emotion with less dialogue. Writers placed focus on the choices offered to Gethin at the clinic. The doctor talks him through pallative care as an alternative option as well as repeatedly asking him whether he still wants to continue or whether he would like to leave. Despite this, Gethin remains certain with his choice. An Inside Soap columinst observed that although Jan agrees to stay with Gethin as he dies, she is struggling with "the enormity of her ex-husband's decision". When Jan returns home alone, she faces questioning from British police. The assisted dying organisation My Death, My Decision noted how the story mirrors real-life events surrounding loved ones being questioned after returning from Swiss clinics. Jan's arrest was devised as the show's cliffhanger when it went finished for its annual autumn break.

== Reception ==
For her portrayal of Jan, Botcher was nominated for Best Drama Star at the 2021 Inside Soap Awards. In 2024, Botcher won the Drama Performance award at the Royal Television Society Cymru Awards.

Ahead of the character's debut, Dainty (Digital Spy) wrote, "Give this one a go, she'll grow on you." Reilly, writing for What to Watch, opined, "Jan didn't disappoint with her mix of tough love, compassion and fantastic one-liners!" She was a fan of Botcher and considered her to be "excellently cast in the role" of Jan. In a May 2019 piece on the show's successes, Dainty listed the focus on the paramedics and introductions of Jan and Ruby as reasons behind it. She described the group of characters as "inspirational" and wrote, "A greater use of the paramedics has taken the show back to its roots and made it feel old school again". Hannah Davies from TVTimes liked the character and observed that Botcher had "won legions of fans" in her portrayal of Jan. She noted that the character was recognised for her "warmth and sense of duty". Smethurst (who plays Sah Brockner) called Jan "a beloved character for Casualty's fans". In 2022, executive producer Sen recognised Jan as "one of [the show's] most popular paramedics".

In February 2019, Reilly called the character "something of a mystery" and "a closed book", so was excited about the unexpected introduction of her son and thought it would create some "juicy storylines". She noted that Ross' introduction left her with many unanswered questions. The reporter added, "We've liked Jan Jenning since her first shift and can't wait to see what the future holds for this intriguing character." Dainty chose Jan as a character that viewers should watch in the build up to Ffion's introduction. Writing for TVTimes, Reilly selected the drug smuggling plot as a television highlight on multiple occasions. She praised Botcher's performance in the story and wrote, "Di Botcher is superb as the tormented paramedic who sinks to unimaginable lows". The beginning of the plot was chosen as the magazine's "pick of the day".

David Brown from the Radio Times praised Botcher's performance in "Thin Green Line". He wrote that her "in the moment" reaction "emphasises the frustrations of log-jammed patients and the gruelling nature of life as a paramedic in an NHS buckling under extreme stress". TVTimes' Victoria Wilson called the episode "Casualty at its best" and enjoyed the paramedics being at its centre. Sue Haasler of the Metro liked the "edgy, nervy feeling" of the improvisation episode and admired the cast's performance. She wrote, "It genuinely felt like we were there alongside real paramedics and massive credit has to go to the four lead actors for their skill in taking their characters through this unscripted journey".

The assisted dying story received a positive reception from critics. Reilly from TV Times praised Botcher and Pugh's onscreen relationship, writing, "Acting heavyweights Di Botcher and Robert Pugh are well matched as they get stuck into the crux of Jan and Gethin's painful euthanasia story tonight." Trevor Moore, the chair of My Death, My Decision, praised the storyline and hoped it would raise awareness for assisted dying and encourage the government to support its legalisation. Jan and Gethin's "tearful" goodbye was chosen as the magazine's "pick of the day". Reilly gave "Switzerland", the episode featuring Gethin's death, a 5-star review and called it "a hard-hitting and emotional journey, sensitively presented and from several angles". On the topic of assisted dying, she added, "A poignant and intimate exploration of a difficult subject in expert hands with Di Botcher and Robert Pugh." Dainty (Digital Spy) described the scenes as "heartbreaking". Her colleague, Erin Zammitt, believed the episode was a great example of Casualty creating "high-quality drama". She wrote, "It was an incredibly emotional episode, and while it was the culmination of a powerfully told storyline, it also could be appreciated as a standalone hour of TV." Sarah Beardsall, the episode's producer, praised Botcher's work on the episode in a social media post. She wrote that due to Pugh's lack of dialogue, Botcher had to "carry every scene" and "rose majestically to the challenge, playing a deep range of emotion, as well as some comedy gold." "Switzerland" was selected as one of the episodes submitted as part of Casualty's nomination for the British Academy Television Award for Best Soap and Continuing Drama in 2024. At the ceremony, the show won the accolade.
