= Jacob Masters =

Fictional character from the BBC medical drama Casualty

- Casualty character
- Charles Venn as Jacob Masters
- First appearance: "If You Could Bottle It"; 18 July 2015
- Portrayed by: Charles Venn
- Duration: 2015–

In-universe information
- Occupation: Paramedic; (prev. clinical nurse manager, Senior staff nurse)
- Family: Omo Masters (mother)
- Significant others: Connie Beauchamp; Sam Nicholls
- Children: Blake Gardner (son)
- Relatives: Carter Gardner (grandson)

Jacob Masters is a fictional character from the British medical drama Casualty, played by Charles Venn. He made his first appearance during the twenty-ninth series episode "If You Could Bottle It", which was broadcast on 18 July 2015. Venn's casting was announced on 13 February 2015 and he began filming at the show's studios that same week. Jacob is a former army medic turned nurse, who is given a job at Holby City Hospital after he brings a patient into the Emergency Department (ED).

Jacob is portrayed as being direct, confident, manipulative and unconventional. Jacob was given connections within the ED through fellow nurse Louise Tyler (Azuka Oforka) and consultant Elle Gardner (Jaye Griffiths). His early storylines saw him implement a "controversial" protocol in the ED, held hostage by terrorists and then shot by a police officer. Jacob is seen struggling with the IPCC's decision not to take action against the officer. The character has had an on-off relationship with Connie Beauchamp (Amanda Mealing), which became popular with viewers who gave them the portmanteau #Jonnie on social media. The couple's relationship was tested several times.

Later storylines have seen Jacob revealed as the biological father of Elle's son, Blake Gardner (Kai Thorne). In June 2018, Jacob's was given a new love interest in the form of paramedic Sam Nicholls (Charlotte Salt). Exploration of the character's background began in September 2018 with the arrival of his mother Omo (Ellen Thomas). For his portrayal of Jacob, Venn won the Favourite Male TV Personality accolade at the 2016 Screen Nation Film and Television Awards. Critics have had a mixed response to the character, with Alison Graham of the Radio Times calling him "a cocky narcissist", while Elaine Reilly from What's on TV thought he had become "one of the foundations of the ED".

== Casting ==
On 13 February 2015, the BBC Media Centre announced Charles Venn had joined the cast of Casualty as new nurse Jacob Masters. Venn began filming at the show's Roath Lock Studios that same week. Of his casting, Venn commented, "It's truly a pleasure and honour to be part of Casualty as it's such a successful long-standing medical drama. I'm keenly relishing the challenge and my time in Cardiff and I look forward to tackling the role of nurse Jacob." Shortly after he was cast as Jacob, Venn's mother told him that he would be working alongside his cousin, Azuka Oforka (who plays Louise Tyler). Venn admitted that he had no idea they were related, but called it a "wonderful surprise" and said they had worked on a storyline together. Venn filmed five months worth of scenes before they aired. He made his first appearance as Jacob during the episode broadcast on 18 July 2015.

== Development ==
=== Characterisation ===
In his fictional backstory, Jacob was an army medic and then a highly experienced nurse, whose focus is on saving lives. He comes from South London and has developed "a down-to-earth and streetwise attitude", which allows him to help the more challenging patients. Executive producer Oliver Kent stated that Jacob would create excitement and "ruffle a lot of feathers". Venn told a reporter for The Sunday Post that Jacob is "confident", "unconventional" and is direct, which annoys some people. His nursing style is "controversial, but he definitely gets the job done". Venn also said that his character would divide opinion, and people will either think Jacob is "a cool dude" or an "arrogant fella". But Jacob does not mind if he is not liked, he just wants to be respected.

The character's profile on BBC Online stated that he has a "maverick attitude", but he is courageous and "Holby's answer to Robin Hood". Venn compared Jacob to his EastEnders character Ray Dixon. Although they are very different, Venn thought they were both "charming", but Jacob is more manipulative than Ray. Venn told Allison Jones from Inside Soap that he enjoys wearing Jacob's medical scrubs. He likened them to the uniforms worn by characters in Star Trek, which he felt gave them "swagger". He found that Jacob's uniform had the same effect on his portrayal of the character, and found that "it gives me an extra spring in my step, and it makes me feel two inches taller."

=== Introduction ===
The character's first scenes saw him entering the Emergency Department (ED) of Holby City Hospital and demand treatment for his friend. When Connie Beauchamp (Amanda Mealing) learns that Jacob is a nurse, she tells him that the hospital is currently advertising for one. Venn explained that Connie is impressed by Jacob and his confidence. He continued, "Jacob wins his position in an unconventional, but effective manner – that's how he rolls." Jacob also wins over his new colleagues with his "subordination" of Connie. The character was given immediate connections within the ED through nurse Louise Tyler and consultant Elle Gardner (Jaye Griffiths). Jacob trained with Louise, while he attended the same school as Elle and they become good friends.

One of Jacob's early storylines saw him implement a "controversial" gun and gangs protocol in the ED, following the admittance of a teenager who has been shot. Knowing Jackson (Louis Chandler-Joseph) is a member of a gang, Jacob worries that the hospital could be the setting for a revenge attack. Connie gives permission for his new protocol to go ahead and Jacob expresses confidence that it will prevent further incidents. However, Jackson's partner Roxanne (Tiffany Brown) is later stabbed in the ED.

=== Shooting ===
During the thirtieth series episode "Belief", Jacob is involved in a terrorist incident at the hospital and is shot by a police officer. The storyline begins with an attack carried out on an extremist vigilante group, who have been vandalising mosques. The assailant is brought into the ED along with those who have been injured, and Connie suspects that trouble between the two groups is forthcoming. A gunman then opens fire in reception, forcing an evacuation of the hospital, so he and his friends can attack the leader of the vigilante group. Realising that some of their colleagues are still inside, Connie and Jacob manage to sneak back in and find themselves held hostage in the boardroom. A spokesperson told Sarah Ellis of Inside Soap that the police are informed that one of the armed terrorists is dressed as a nurse, so when Jacob manages to get hold of a gun, the police open fire without asking questions. Connie struggles to save Jacob, and his condition initially worsens, before he stabilises.

Jacob returns to work a few weeks later, concerning his colleagues, who worry that he is coming back too soon. Jacob throws himself into his work and starts undermining authority "in his usually brash manner". But when he learns that the Independent Police Complaints Commission (IPCC) want to pin the blame on him for the shooting, he "begins to unravel". Connie calms him down and after she convinces him to visit a counsellor, they almost share a kiss. The storyline concluded with Jacob's attempt to find out the name of the officer who shot him and get his revenge, after he learns that the IPCC are not taking any action against the officer. Jacob shows that he is not happy with the development and makes a call to one of his "dodgy contacts" in an attempt to find out the officer's name.

=== Relationship with Connie Beauchamp ===
"When I first started this storyline, I wasn't sure if the viewers would be like, 'Nah, we're not feeling that'. But it hasn't been like that at all – they love it! They champion it."

— Venn on the viewer reaction to the Jacob and Connie pairing.

Upon his introduction, it was shown that Jacob was attracted to Connie and Venn thought they would make a good couple. Venn said Connie was impressed by Jacob's style and confidence, and he observed that Connie is looking for "an assertive man who knows what he wants and is very good at his job". Connie initially denies her own attraction to Jacob. The show's annual autumn trailer later showed the couple becoming close and engaging in an arm wrestling contest.

Jacob and Connie's attraction to one another culminated in them sharing a kiss in Connie's office. The storyline begins with the pair working together to save a patient in the back of an overturned ambulance. Venn explained to Sarah Ellis, "It's a very highly charged situation, which leads to an intimate moment for the two of them." The actor admitted to feeling emotional about the episode, as Jacob becomes invested in patient, Flo's (Alison Pargeter) situation. As Jacob and Connie treat Flo for a leg injury, she tells them that she is meeting up with her love interest, who has flown over from Australia to take her back with him. Connie thinks Flo's boyfriend is a fraud, but Jacob has faith that he will show up. Ellis observed that Jacob's "romantic outlook on the situation starts to thaw her icy heart". When Flo dies from her injuries, Jacob and Connie seek comfort in each other. Venn stated that before the episode, he had viewers asking him when Jacob and Connie were going to get together, as they were enjoying their chemistry. However, he also said that the couple would be in for a bumpy ride after their moment together.

Connie realises how strong her feelings for Jacob are when he risks his own life to save her. The soon become a couple, but when they are seen kissing by Connie's daughter Grace Beauchamp (Emily Carey), Connie is forced to choose between them both. Producers implemented a break-up for the couple. On-screen, Connie and Jacob argue, and Connie ends the relationship in order to focus on her daughter. Later that day, Jacob goes out with the paramedics and attends to a patient left injured after a building collapse. When a doctor is needed at the scene, Connie "doesn't hesitate" and it becomes obvious to everyone that she still loves Jacob. Connie is forced to amputate the patient's arm to get him out, but she and Jacob start arguing again and they fall through the floor when the roof suddenly caves in. Both Connie and Jacob are trapped in the basement and sand begins pouring in.

Venn admitted that the scenes were some of the most challenging he had filmed during his time with the show. He and Mealing chose to stay in the purpose built basement set, so they would create "as much as a claustrophobic, enclosed feel as possible". When Connie and Jacob realise that they are going to be buried alive, she radios the hospital to say goodbye to Grace. However, they are soon rescued by their colleagues and the fire brigade. When asked by Elaine Reilly of What's on TV if the couple would reconcile, Mealing expressed her desire to see them back together, as it was obvious they still cared for one another. Of Connie's feelings, she explained, "I think Jacob is the only person she's really loved. He's the only person she's allowed into her life fully. She's very guarded. To Connie being in love is a vulnerable place. Jacob is the only person she allowed in, but even then she pushed him away!"

Weeks later, Jacob has another near-death experience, which leads to a reconciliation with Connie. The former couple are driving to a conference, where Jacob is due to give a speech, when they are flagged down by another driver, who tells them a man is stuck in a storm drain. Jacob jumps in the water "without a thought for his own safety", but is soon swept downstream by the current. A spokesperson said Connie is left to "watch in horror" as Jacob heads towards a waterfall. However, he manages to pull himself up onto a bank, before going back in to help the man and get him out. Jacob's actions lead Connie to realise how close she was to losing him. She supports him when he admits that he has a fear of public speaking, before his presentation. Connie and Jacob are soon "getting hot and heavy" in her room, and Ellis (Inside Soap) wondered if they could make their relationship work this time.

Grace soon discovers that her mother and Jacob are back together, and she is initially unhappy about the development. The relationship is soon tested by an accident that sees Connie and Grace injured after their car plunges into a ravine. During "Too Old for This Shift", the helicopter transporting Grace to the hospital crashes. Mealing told David Brown of Radio Times that the accident would impact Connie's relationship with Jacob, leaving it strained. Mealing also admitted that she liked her character's relationship with Jacob, and felt that he matched her. Jacob tries to support Connie through Grace's recovery, but their relationship starts to cool off. When Connie blames fellow consultant and Jacob's friend Elle Gardner for Grace's condition, it leads to the couple breaking up for a second time. In September 2017, series producer Lucy Raffety confirmed that there were no immediate plans to reunite Connie and Jacob, saying "Her and Jacob remain friends, absolutely."

=== Fatherhood ===
Series producer Lucy Raffety teased a long-running storyline between Jacob and Elle Gardener in September 2017, saying "Something massive happens with Elle and Jacob which totally redefines their friendship forever. That is a wonderful story and I'm really excited about that." Venn stated that Jacob's life is changed forever by a big revelation from Elle. In the lead up to the moment, Jacob tries to help find Elle's son Blake (Kai Thorne), who has skipped school because he is struggling to get along with his father and Elle's new partner.

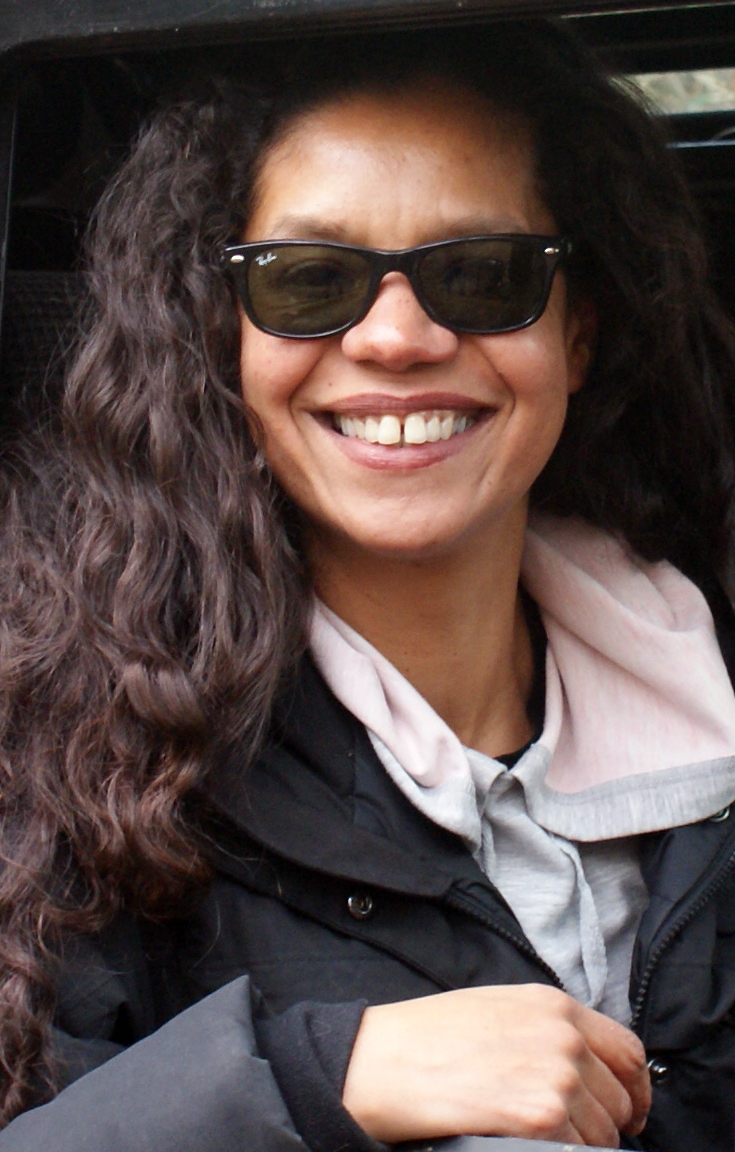
In late 2017, Jacob learns that he has fathered a child with his best friend Elle Gardener, played by Jaye Griffiths (pictured).

Venn explained Jacob has often helped out with Blake in the past and comes across as "a cool uncle", who Blake looks up to. Jacob eventually locates Blake, who appears to be drunk. Venn said, "Jacob makes clear to Blake that he has messed up, and his mum is going to eventually find out what he's done." Elle realises that Blake has injured himself after stealing alcohol from a shop, and Jacob helps to calm things down between mother and son.

Elle then reveals that Jacob is Blake's biological father. She explains that she conceived after they had a one-night stand during a bad patch in Elle's marriage. Griffiths revealed that she and Venn had known about the storyline from the moment she joined the cast. They made time to rehearse the reveal scene and Griffiths admitted that it was hard, saying "We tried to avoid Elle and Jacob having a Star Wars 'I am your father' moment, which was very tricky!" Griffiths thought Elle was always planning on telling Jacob the truth, but she struggled to find the right moment. The actress added that Elle and Jacob's friendship would be broken after her revelation.

Jacob tells Elle that he does not want to take parental responsibility for Blake. He takes a brief holiday and on his return, he tries to avoid Elle. When Blake is later brought into the ED, Jacob gets involved and offers his son some advice. Without talking to Elle first, Jacob tells Blake that he is his father. Shortly after, Blake's fellow student Miles Ashworth (Finney Cassidy) is admitted to the ED with a serious head injury, and Jacob reveals that Miles has been bullying their son. Blake is soon arrested for assault. Both Jacob and Elle accompany Blake to court, but Elle leaves when she learns that Miles has been readmitted to the hospital in a bad condition. Jacob, who has been left "holding the fort", agrees to give Blake a character reference when Elle does not return. Blake is not given a prison sentence and he leaves court with his parents. He then tells his mother that he wants to move in with Jacob, leaving Elle "noticeably devastated".

=== Relationship with Sam Nicholls ===
In April 2018, a potential romance between Jacob and paramedic Sam Nicholls (Charlotte Salt) was teased in the show's annual spring trailer. A couple of months later, the storyline began with Jacob providing support to Sam, after she endures a "traumatic" incident that occurred during her shift. They grow closer when Sam offers to give Blake some boxing lessons. Venn told Sarah Ellis of Inside Soap that Jacob sees Sam as someone who is "strong, confident, and very self-assured". He likes women who challenge him, and he feels that Sam can do that, plus they have "an unexpected" spark. Jacob also appreciates Sam's help with Blake, as he is still getting used to being a father.

Following a night shift, Sam thanks Jacob for his recent support and invites him to have breakfast with her, where they flirt and Jacob realises that she may have feelings for him. Sam challenges Jacob to a boxing match and reckons she will win, which Jacob think is unlikely. Venn commented, "He's a bit blasé about things, he sees it as a fun form of courtship!" Sam manages to knock Jacob down and they share a kiss, before Jacob falls unconscious. Venn joked that it was probably because Jacob's blood pressure was just starting to rise. Venn also explained that both Jacob and Sam want their relationship to work, and they enjoy keeping it a secret, but it soon becomes a problem as Blake grows closer to Sam. When Sam dies, Jacob "has some emotional moments" as he deals with his grief and comes to terms with her death. He also has to support Blake, who developed a crush on her.

=== Mother ===
Further exploration of the character's background began in September 2018, upon the introduction of his mother Omo Masters, played by Ellen Thomas. Sophie Dainty of Digital Spy said Jacob has a "complicated past" and series producer Lucy Raffety commented that mother and son would not have "a happy family reunion". Blake meets up with Omo for the day, but when she becomes agitated, Blake is forced to call an ambulance and she is admitted to the ED. Jacob is "stunned" to see his mother, as they have been estranged for several years, and he tells Elle that Omo has schizophrenia. Omo becomes further distressed when the voices in her head grow louder, and Jacob and Elle soon find her standing in the middle of the ED, having pulled out her cannula.

== Reception ==
"Jacob certainly divided fans. When you have this guy who's bolshie confident, leftfield... I knew that could rub a couple of people up the wrong way!"

— Venn on the viewers response to Jacob. (2016)

For his portrayal of Jacob, Venn won the Favourite Male TV Personality accolade at the 2016 Screen Nation Film and Television Awards. He was also longlisted for Best Newcomer at the 21st National Television Awards.

Alison Graham of the Radio Times had a mixed response to the character. Following his debut, she branded him "a cocky narcissist". In a later review, Graham dubbed him "the hunky new nurse", whose "inability to find a shirt" had attracted attention from his female colleagues. Graham thought Jacob was "an insufferable know-it-all" and hoped he would have "a spectacular fall from grace very soon". Holly Wade, writing for the same publication, said "Senior Staff Nurse Jacob has ruffled feathers since he joined the ED a few weeks ago. He's impulsive and bossy but nonetheless pretty impressive."

Inside Soap's Allison Jones called him "no-nonsense" and thought he would be "a controversial character". She also thought that he would make a big impression on the ED, like Venn's EastEnders character Ray Dixon did on Albert Square. Elaine Reilly from What's on TV wrote, "When Jacob first joined the team he was cocky in the extreme. These days Jacob's mellowed into a confident, expert senior nurse and one of the foundations of the ED. Jacob has a red-hot temper. It's mostly under control – but not always!" Kayleigh Dray, writing for Closer believed that Connie and Jacob were "perfect for one another". The couple became popular with viewers, who dubbed them "#Jonnie" on social media.

A Daily Mirror reporter branded Jacob "hunky", and they observed that he was "the hero of the Emergency Department" after correctly diagnosing two poisoned patients. When Jacob helped a man talk to his crush, another reporter for the publication commented that he was "Fancying himself as a bit of a ladies' man, and channelling Ryan Gosling in romcom Crazy Stupid Love." The Mirror's Nicola Methven dubbed the character a "hunky, maverick nurse". After Elle told Jacob that Blake was his son, Reilly (What's on TV) branded them a "traumatised trio".
