= Bedlam (2011 TV series) =

- Created by: Neil Jones; David Allison; Chris Parker
- Starring: Theo James; Will Young; Charlotte Salt; Ashley Madekwe; Hugo Speer; Lacey Turner; Jack Roth; Nikesh Patel; Gemma Chan
- Country of origin: United Kingdom
- Original language: English
- No. of seasons: 2
- No. of episodes: 12

Production
- Producer: Matthew Bird
- Running time: 45 mins approx

Original release
- Network: Sky Living; Sky Living HD
- Release: 7 February 2011 – 11 July 2012

Bedlam is a British supernatural drama television series created by David Allison, Neil Jones, and Chris Parker. It was first broadcast on 7 February 2011 on Sky Living and Sky Living HD. The series finale was broadcast on 15 March 2011. In December 2011, it was announced that a second series had been commissioned for broadcasting in early 2012, with an updated cast. The second series was then broadcast from June 2012 .

On 11 March 2013, it was announced on Twitter that Bedlam would not be returning for a third season.

== Plot ==
The series focused on an upmarket block of flats called "Bedlam Heights", formerly a mental asylum, and the supernatural activity taking place there. The character Jed Harper (Theo James) possesses the ability to see ghosts, which are generally not visible to others, and receives visions of their deaths. The hauntings are generally malevolent, and it is up to Jed to determine the spirits' motives and thwart their goals. His flatmates are his adopted cousin, Kate (Charlotte Salt), who assists her father, Warren (Hugo Speer), who owns the complex; Ryan (Will Young), who is troubled by the recent violent death of his brother; and Molly (Ashley Madekwe), a childhood friend of Kate and Jed. The asylum was formerly owned and run by Warren's family for generations, and he worked there when his father ran it, before it was closed down after the ill-treatment of patients was revealed.

The second series saw the cast changed, with suspended paramedic Ellie (Lacey Turner) beginning to see ghosts. She travels to Bedlam Heights (now renamed "Brightmoor") in order to seek out Jed Harper. Whilst there, she befriends Max (Jack Roth), the complex's barman; Dan (Nikesh Patel), who has replaced Kate; and Keira (Gemma Chan), a childhood friend of Kate's and now Warren's girlfriend. Warren and, briefly, Kate are the only cast members to return from the first series.

== Episodes ==
=== Series 1 (2011) ===
No.	Title	Directed by	Written by	Original release date	UK viewers (millions)
1	"Cohabitants"	John Strickland	Neil Jones, David Allison & Chris Parker	7 February 2011	845,000
Bedlam Heights, a haunted apartment building, is owned by Warren Bettany, who is assisted by his daughter Kate, who lives with Ryan McAllister and Molly Lucas. It was previously a mental asylum also owned by the family, but closed due to the abuse of patients. Jed Harper, Kate's adopted cousin, is able to see spirits and stop their malice. Bedlam has seen various paranormal activities, which in some way involves water and drowning, referring to Ryan's brother James' death. After saving Kate and Ryan from a paranormal occurrence, Jed requests to stay in Bedlam for several nights. Jed confides on his visions of James' death to Ryan. One night, Kate is drowned in the bathtub by spirits. Jed saves her and Kate retains him.
2	"Driven"	John Strickland	Neil Jones	14 February 2011	741,000
Kate and Jed grow suspicious of new tenant Leah Cole: the car she stole from her abusive boyfriend Daryl is subjected to paranormal events, a tire track in her room kills her pet, and her real name turns out to be Kerry. Jed envisions asylum patient Mackay who killed himself; it is revealed that Mackay's wife and two children were involved in a hit and run with Kerry, and later a familicide. Kerry confesses that she was driving under the influence after fleeing from Daryl. By Jed's persuasion, Kerry confesses to the police to stop Mackay's spirit from haunting her. Meanwhile, Warren opposes having posters of missing tenant Zoe Fielding around Bedlam.
3	"Inmates"	Alrick Riley	David Allison	21 February 2011	746,000
Jed befriends a woman named Sadie, and invites her to Bedlam. She frequently has visions of handprints and repeatedly gets rid of a box that constantly haunts her: she used it to bury her stillborn baby, whose pregnancy she hid, inflaming her mental health. Meanwhile, Ryan meets former patient Grace, who reveals that Zoe's case is tied to a series of girls disappearing since 1983. She reveals to Jed that his mother Julia Gaskell was a patient pregnant with him at the hospital; he was stolen by the Bettanys after Julia died of childbirth. Later, Grace is found dead.
4	"Hide and Seek"	John Strickland	Chris Parker	28 February 2011	561,000
Jed envisions Warren suffocating Grace, causing her death. A six-year-old girl named Ella, who lives in Bedlam with her father, interacts with a peer ghost named Alice Brackley. One night, Alice draws a horrific creature on the wall, explaining to Ella a "bad man" coerced her; Jed and Ryan learn that the man, deluded psychopath Henry Douglas, killed Alice (who lived in Bedlam's staff quarters) by suffocation in March 1890. When Jed discovers Alice's doll, he takes it to her tomb, separating her from Ella. At an abandoned upper hallway, he discovers Zoe's body, which disappears when he returns; he assumes Warren is the conspirator.
5	"Committed"	Alrick Riley	Neil Jones	7 March 2011	683,000
While Warren claimed Julia got pregnant with Jed upon admission to the asylum, he was born 11 months later; former staff member Ray Bowman reveals she was raped by multiple staff and denied delivery at a proper hospital. Jed has visions of a man named Robert Bettany raping a servant named Isobel Hyde, before throwing her in Bedlam. Meanwhile, a tenant named Mark is haunted by his history of leaving women; one night, Isobel's spirit manifests as his ex Sarah and suffocates him to death. Kate learns that his father attempted (and failed) to incinerate Zoe's necklace.
6	"Burning Man"	Alrick Riley	David Allison & Chris Parker	14 March 2011	647,000
Molly is haunted by random fires, which Jed correlates to a 1979 arson at the asylum, incited by a patient and killing three. Ryan decides to sleep with Molly, but at one point leaves the room, dismaying Molly who leaves Bedlam and enters a van. Kate has a flashback to when his father and grandfather retrieved a corpse in a room in the upper hallway, theorizing Zoe might be there too. Jed breaks in and enters an elevator, leading to the room Julia delivered him; he then sees Julia whose head has the letter B carved. Kate follows suit but the corridor leading to the room explodes; Warren takes her back up.

=== Series 2 (2012) ===
No.	Title	Directed by	Written by	Original release date	UK viewers (millions)
1	"The Long Drop"	Fraser MacDonald	Neil Jones	6 June 2012	743,000
A woman named Ellie has been seeing visions of peoples deaths. She finds out that she is linked to Bedlam Heights, so she decides to stay there to find out more information. Warren has hired Dan to take Kate's job but she is not pleased with his plans to keep selling and developing despite Jed's death. She attempts to convince him but is waylaid by Dan. Frustrated Kate accidentally walks in on her father with Keira, a school friend, she decides to leave but is kidnapped by a bald man who has been stalking her. While the rest of the residents are trying to sell the mansion, Ellie goes into the attic and finds a skeleton, and it's not long before the ghost of the skeleton tries to kill her...
2	"Pool of Tears"	Fraser MacDonald	Chris Parker	13 June 2012	618,000
Max starts a blog showing the horrific pictures found in the bedlam attics. This interferes with Dan and Warren's plan to sell the house. Dan hatches a plot to snare the blogger by luring him with old photographs about the hospital. Meanwhile, an Olympic swimmer named Cass (guest star Kathryn Prescott) is being haunted by a ghost that (according to Ellie's vision) was tortured in the pool. Tensions begin to rise as Warren begins to experience blackouts and visions concerning a bald man competing with his worries for Kate.
3	"Unfaithful"	Fraser Macdonald	David Allison	20 June 2012	545,000
A woman named Rita is getting married, but this happy day could be her last as a ghost bride starts haunting her with music boxes and messages. Meanwhile, Ellie starts seeing visions of how the bride came to die. Will this ghost ruin Reeta's wedding? As Keira attempts to repair her relationship with Warren, Dan interprets her attempts as money motivated. Kate's social page is flooded with friends wondering as to her whereabouts. Warren begins receiving calls from Kate with her screaming in the background punctuated by heavy breathing. Dan sleeps with Ellie as Max gets up the courage to ask her out.
4	"Jude"	Amy Neil	Neil Jones	27 June 2012	486,000
A repairman and his brother, Jude, come to stay at Bedlam Heights, however Jude wanders off into a room with an electric chair, and it's not long before a ghost boy possesses Jude. The horrible truth concerning the boy's detainment at Bedlam finally comes out with Max and Ellie discovering the high mortality rate due to illegal and extreme treatment procedures. Ellie reveals a secret to Max which could change her future. Meanwhile Dan reveals his secret to Warren. Max swears to help Ellie through her crisis. Warren now has begun to check Kate's online page daily as she hasn't been on for over a month, worries set in as to her whereabouts.
5	"Dare"	Amy Neil	David Allison	4 July 2012	453,000
Liam (guest star Joel Fry) breaks into the former asylum's old chapel to conduct a midnight occult-style ceremony, but he suffers the consequences after angering the ghost of a priest. In the meantime Dan follows Warren, who is in a trance to the basement of the building where Kate's fate is revealed. Meanwhile, Ellie has a vision of the priest and finds out that he saw something he shouldn't have before he died. Dan finds out who has been ruining his business image. Ellie discovers the terrible secret witnessed by the priest in the Bedlam maternity ward. Eve's unusual appearance and close proximity to Ellie is revealed to be linked with her past.
6	"Reunion"	Amy Neil	Chris Parker	11 July 2012	448,000
Ellie, after discovering part of who she is and why she has the B symbol on her shoulder, decides to move away from the Bedlam house, but the ghost of Max's dad appears and leaves a key to the tunnels that Ellie has been seeing in her visions. Max and Ellie investigate while Keira attempts to force Dan to call the police about what he witnessed in the basement. Max is lured away from Ellie by a false vision of his dead father leaving her alone in the tunnels. Warren attempts suicide only to be thwarted by Dan who reveals he has lost his hatred for him. Max asks for help to rescue Ellie who is now trapped with the real villain. Warren tells everyone what really happened to Zoe as well as the other missing girls, and we finally meet the evil mastermind: Joseph Bale who had been taking girls in order to replace Eve who escaped as a child. Warren forces everyone out when Ellie manages to escape Joseph's clutches, however when Warren kills Joseph, Warren's body comes out of the tunnels instead. Ellie's full past is revealed as well as her connections to Jed, who is now dead. She decides to stay when they realize Joseph is still alive, in order to stop him.

== Main cast ==
Character	Actor	Duration
Jed Harper	Theo James	2011
Ryan McAllistar	Will Young	2011
Molly Lucas	Ashley Madekwe	2011
Kate Bettany	Charlotte Salt	2011–12
Warren Bettany	Hugo Speer	2011-12
Ellie Flint	Lacey Turner	2012
Max	Jack Roth	2012
Dan	Nikesh Patel	2012
Keira	Gemma Chan	2012

== Reception ==
The TV series was met with mixed reviews from critics. Common Sense Media gave it a rating of 2 out of 5, "thanks to its ultimately ineffective attempts to scare you into caring." Critics praised for the horror, bipolar drama plot, and casting. Some criticized the special effects, calling it "cheesy rather than spooky," as well as the lack of suspense. GamesRadar+ rated Season 2, Episode 1 as 2.4 out of 5, describing it as "Bedlam is back with a bang. Ok, there’s not much bang, but it definitely is back, so I was at least half right... it’s all a bit underwhelming really."
