= Di Botcher =

Welsh actress

- Born: Diane F. Botcher; 2 June 1959 (age 67); Port Talbot, Wales
- Occupation: Actress
- Years active: 1986–present
- Known for: Stella; Little Britain; Casualty; Downton Abbey

Diane F. Botcher (born 2 June 1959) is a Welsh actress. She has starred in several British television sitcoms and dramas, including the Sky comedy drama Stella, BBC comedies Little Britain and Tittybangbang and the ITV period drama Downton Abbey. In 2018, she joined Casualty as Jan Jenning.

== Early life ==
Botcher was born on 2 June 1959 in Taibach, Port Talbot, Glamorgan, in Wales, one of the two children of parents Bernard and Glenys Botcher. She read English and drama at Warwick University, and after graduating, trained at the Webber Douglas Academy of Dramatic Art drama school in London, then obtained an Equity card in the 1980s.

== Career ==
Throughout her long career on stage and screen, Botcher has been receiving warm reviews. In a performance of the musical Blood Brothers with the Sherman Theatre Company in 1986, Botcher's performance as the "warm-hearted mum" was singled out by a reviewer as one of the good points in a production which needed "beefing up". Of Black Milk (2003), a reviewer wrote, "In a strong cast, Di Botcher is a beacon." Her performance in the 2017/18 revival of Follies was universally appreciated - "magical"; a "stunner of a set piece"; "wonderful".

In 2018, she began appearing in the BBC medical drama Casualty as Jan Jenning. Later that year, she also began portraying the role of Nana Margie in the BBC Three series In My Skin. 2022 BBC Radio 4 The Archers as Caitlin Thomas.

== Filmography ==
=== Film ===
Year	Title	Role	Notes
1997	Twin Town	Jean Lewis	
2002	All or Nothing	Supervisor	Cameo role
2002	Ant Muzak	Diana Fluck the Checkout Assistant	Short film
2008	Albert's Speech	Gloria	Short film
2011	Hunky Dory	Viv's mum	
2012	The Gospel of Us	The Mother	Set in Botcher's birthplace
2013	Svengali	Mrs Cooper	
2013	One Chance	Nurse	Cameo role
2015	Under Milk Wood	Mrs Dai Bread Two	
2020	Dream Horse	Nerys	
2021	La Cha Cha	Mrs. Fruitcake	

=== Television ===
Year	Title	Role	Notes
1986	Screen Two	Officer Kyle	Series 2, Episode 2
1987	The District Nurse	Eirlys Prosser	Series 3, Episode 6
1993, 1997	The Bill	Mrs. Oakes/Mrs. Edwards	2 episodes
1997	Harpur and Iles	Jane Mellick	Television film
1999	Sunburn	Wendy's mum	Series 1, Episode 3
1999	Kavanagh QC	Tilly Burgess	Series 5, Episode 2
1999	Rhinoceros	Megan Jones	Television film
2001	Fun at the Funeral Parlour	Edith	Series 1, Episode 4
2001	People Like Us	Frances Churchfield	Series 2, Episode 6
2001	The Armando Iannucci Shows	Tinaturnerogram	2 episodes
2001	'Orrible	Di Clark	Recurring character
2002	Casualty	Louise Templeton	Series 16, Episode 26
2002	Tipping the Velvet	Woman with Cigar	2 episodes
2002	Cruise of the Gods	Mrs. Hatcher	Television film
2002–2008	High Hopes	Mrs. Coles	Recurring character; 20 episodes
2003–2005	Little Britain	Marion/Meals on Wheels Lady	6 episodes
2003–2009	Belonging	Vanessa	Recurring character
2004	Green Wing	Catering Manager	Series 1, Episode 3
2005	All About George	Dorothy Mickens	Episode 1
2005	The Thick of It	Pauline McKendrick, Piss Woman	Series 2, Episode 1
2005	Bleak House	Mrs. Woodcourt	2 episodes
2006–2007	Tittybangbang	Various characters	5 episodes
2006–2008	Pulling	Margaret	Recurring character
2007	Ideal	Nicki's mum	Voice only
2007	Hotel Babylon	Myra Walmesley	Series 2, Episode 8
2007	Murphy's Law	Brothel Madam	2 episodes
2007	After You've Gone	Sheila	Series 2, Episode 5
2008	Coming of Age	Ollie's mum	Series 1, Episode 5
2008	Dustbin Baby	Pat	Television film
2008–2009	Katy Brand's Big Ass Show	Various characters	5 episodes
2008, 2010, 2012	Doctors	Sharon Bretherton/Linda Bolton/Dorit Simpson	3 episodes
2009	No Signal!	Various characters	Series 1, Episode 9
2009	Collision	Mrs. Whitfield	2 episodes
2010	Lennon Naked	Dot	Television film
2010	Sherlock	Connie Prince	Episode: "The Great Game"
2010	Coming Up	Bernadette	Series 8, Episode 4
2011	Come Fly with Me	Mrs. Talbot	Episode 2
2011	Shirley	Mrs. Morrison	Television film about Dame Shirley Bassey
2011	DCI Banks	Grace	Series 2, Episode 3
2012	Mr Stink	A woman with a question	Television film
2013	Downton Abbey	Nanny West	Series 4, Episode 1
2013–2017	Stella	Aunty Brenda	Main role
2014	Inside No. 9	Jean	Episode: "The Understudy"
2014	Under Milk Wood	Mrs. Dai Bread One	Television film
2015	Coronation Street	Debbie Allinson	2 episodes
2015	Top Coppers	Sandra	
2015	High Hopes	Mrs Coles	
2018–present	Casualty	Jan Jenning	Main role
2018–2021	In My Skin	Nana Margie	Main role

== Selected stage performances ==
Year	Title	Theatre	Role
1986	Blood Brothers	Sherman Theatre	Mother
1986	Richard III	Royal Shakespeare Company at the Adelaide Festival Theatre	Lady of the court
1986–1987	A Midsummer Night's Dream	Royal Shakespeare Company	Titania
1987	Speculators	Royal Shakespeare Company	Carol Cutter
1990	Sunday in the Park with George	London Revival	Frieda (Act One); Elaine (Act Two)
1990	Cats	New London	Grizabella
1993–1994	Sweeney Todd	Ensemble	
1995–1996	A Little Night Music	Mrs Anderssen	
1995	Under Milk Wood	National Theatre	Miss Price; Mrs Beynon
1997	Beauty and the Beast	Dominion Theatre	Madame de la Grande Bouche
1997	Cardiff East	Vera, Marge and Dolly's friend	
1999	Card Boys	Bush Theatre	Iris
2000	Flesh and Blood	Hampstead Theatre	Marge
2003	Terrorism	Royal Court	Old biddy
2003	Black Milk	Royal Court	Auntie Pasha
2004	Les Misérables	Copenhagen	Madame Thenardier
2009	A History Of Falling Things	Theatr Clwyd	Mum
2009	Chicago	Cambridge Theatre	Matron "Mama" Morton
2010	If So, Then Yes	Jermyn Street Theatre	Welsh charlady
2010–2011	A Flea in Her Ear	Old Vic	Olympe
2017–2018	Follies	National Theatre	Hattie Walker
