= Oliver Coleman =

British actor

- Born: 17 March 1983 (age 43)
- Occupation: Actor
- Years active: 2006–present
- Spouse: Charlotte Salt (m. 2014)
- Children: 2

Oliver Coleman (born 17 March 1983) is a British actor. He attended Bedales School in Petersfield, Hampshire. He has two brothers and a sister, Daisy Coleman.

== Biography ==
Coleman portrayed Toby in The Line of Beauty (2006) and Henry Percy in The Other Boleyn Girl (2008), along with cameo appearances in Primeval and Ashes to Ashes.

Coleman played Jed in Vertigo Films' 2012 low-budget horror film The Facility (originally titled Guinea Pigs) directed by Ian Clark.

In 2012 Coleman joined the cast of Casualty in the role of paediatric specialist Dr Tom Kent, making his first appearance on screen on 7 January. He left the show on 14 December 2013 alongside his partner Charlotte Salt.

Oliver then went on to make an appearance in Endeavour which aired on Easter Sunday 2014.

== Personal life ==
On 31 July 2014, Coleman married his Casualty co-star Charlotte Salt in Somerset. Salt gave birth to the couple's first child, a son, in 2017.

== Filmography ==
Year	Title	Role	Notes
2006	The Line of Beauty	Toby Fedden	TV mini-series – "The End of the Street" – "To Whom Do You Beautifully Belong" – "The Love Chord"
2008	The Other Boleyn Girl	Henry Percy	Movie
2008	Primeval	Ed	Season 2 Episode 6
2008	Ashes to Ashes	City Boy	Season 2 Episode 3
2009	The Bill	Dean Gibson	TV series – "Rescue Me"
2012	The Facility	Jed	Film
2012–2013	Casualty	Tom Kent	44 episodes
2014	Endeavour	Henry Portmore	Episode: "Neverland"
