= Charlotte Salt =

English actress (born 1985)

- Born: 12 August 1985 (age 40); Newcastle-under-Lyme, Staffordshire, England
- Occupation: Actor
- Years active: 2001–present
- Spouse: Oliver Coleman (m. 2014)
- Children: 2

Charlotte Salt (born 12 August 1985) is an English actress. On television, she is known for her roles in the BBC One series Born and Bred (2002–2005), Casualty (2011–2013, 2017–2018) and The Musketeers (2015), the ABC Family series Wildfire (2006–2007), and the Sky Living series Bedlam (2011–2012). Her films include Beneath Still Waters (2005), Beowulf (2007) and Blood and Glory (2016).

== Early life and acting career ==
Salt studied at Newcastle-under-Lyme College in Staffordshire, England. At 16 years, Salt had already appeared in several television projects, the series In a Land of Plenty, television film The Whistle-Blower, series The Inspector Lynley Mysteries, the BBC family drama series Born and Bred. Salt was a regular in the US TV series Wildfire as Gillian Parsons for 13 episodes from 2006 to 2007. In 2009, she guest starred as Lady Ursula Misseldon on The Tudors, and as Lady Arabella Marchand du Belmont in the TV movie A Princess for Christmas.

From 2011 to 2018, Salt played Sam Nicholls on Casualty, including a four-year hiatus, before her character's death in the opening episode of the thirty-third series. She has also been a regular in Bedlam (2012) and The Musketeers (2015). In 2013, Salt co-created, with chef Raymond Blanc, an animated children's cooking app, called Henri Le Worm, about a cast of insects, voiced by actor Simon Pegg. The app was designed to inspire children to discover nature in Henri's magical "Forest of Plenty". Salt had a minor role in the Amazon Studios film Everybody's Talking About Jamie, released in September 2021.

== Filmography ==
=== Film ===
Year	Title	Role	Notes / Ref.
2005	Beneath Still Waters	Clara Borgia	
2006	The TV Set	Sarah	
2007	Beowulf	Estrith	
2009	Deep in the Valley	Tracy	Film
2010	Below the Beltway	Hope B.	Film
2010	Ivory	Nadia	Film
2015	The Hoarder	Sarah	
2015	How to Grow Your Own	Alex	Film
2016	The Chamber	Edwards (Red)	
2016	Blood and Glory	Katherine Sterndale	
2019	Cordelia	Regan	Short
2021	Everybody's Talking About Jamie	Cheryl New	

=== Television ===
Year	Title	Role	Notes / Ref.
2001	The Whistle-Blower	Sasha Tracey	TV film
2001	In a Land of Plenty	Teenage Laura	2 episodes – 1.2 & 1.3
2002	The Inspector Lynley Mysteries	Maggie Spence	1 episode – "Missing Joseph"
2003	The Bill	Sarah Morgan	1 episode – 107 – '"Rose-Coloured Glasses'"
2005	Entourage	Waitress	1 episode – Season 2 – "Bat Mitzvah"
2002–2005	Born and Bred	Helen Gilder	20 episodes
2006	CSI: Crime Scene Investigation	Eve Girard	1 episode – "Kiss Kiss, Bye Bye"
2006–2007	Wildfire	Gillian Parsons	13 episodes
2008	Perchance to Dream	Video short	
2009	The Tudors	Lady Ursula Misseldon	5 episodes
2010	Agatha Christie's Marple	Virginia	1 episode – "The Secret of Chimneys"
2011	A Princess for Christmas	Lady Arabella Marchand du Belmont	TV film
2011	Death in Paradise	Lisa Watson	1 episode – series 1 – "Wicked Wedding Night"
2011–2012	Bedlam	Kate Bettany	7 episodes
2015	The Musketeers	Marguerite	8 episodes
2011–2013, 2017–2018	Casualty	Sam Nicholls	119 episodes
2019	Pandora	Norris	1 episode – "I Shall Be Released"
