= Forsaking All Others – Part Two =

- Casualty episode
- Episode no.: Series 29; Episode 46
- Directed by: Julie Edwards
- Written by: Matthew Barry
- Original air date: 23 August 2015
- Running time: 1 hour

Guest appearances
- Gregory Forsyth-Foreman as Louis Fairhead; Mark Letheren as Ben Harding; Kazia Pelka as Greta Miller; Hannah Barrie as Laila Bertrand; Jamie Paul as Barney Glynn; Holly Fry as Sian Elmer; Caroline Partridge as Mary Simms; Lisa Harmer as Registrar

Episode chronology
| ← Previous "Forsaking All Others – Part One" | Next → "A Child's Heart – Part One" |
- Casualty series 29

"Forsaking All Others – Part Two" is the forty-sixth episode of the twenty-ninth series of the British medical drama television series Casualty. The episode was written by Matthew Barry and directed by Julie Edwards, and premiered on BBC One on 23 August 2015, just one day after the first part of the series finale. The episode features the wedding of established characters Zoe Hanna (Sunetra Sarker), a consultant in emergency medicine, and Max Walker (Jamie Davis), a porter at the fictitious emergency department of Holby City.

The episode garnered a total of 6.44 million viewers over a twenty-eight-day period, and was the highest-rated episode of 2015. The Mirror branded the collection of the four two-part episodes as possibly being "the most dramatic episodes in three decades of the series".

== Plot ==
It is the morning of the day of Zoe Hanna (Sunetra Sarker) and Max Walker's (Jamie Davis) wedding, and a hungover Zoe stumbles into the living room to discover she's slept with another man. She gets rid of her one-night stand and prepares to marry Max with a guilty conscience. Before she goes to the registry office, she reveals to her friend, consultant Dylan Keogh (William Beck) that she has been unfaithful to Max and cheated on him. Dylan agrees to keep her secret and Zoe leaves the emergency department (ED) to marry Max. At the registry office, Zoe gets cold feet and tells Max she cannot marry him. When Max asks why she does not give him an answer, and instead goes ahead with the wedding. Max's mother Greta Miller (Kazia Pelka), stepsister Robyn Miller (Amanda Henderson) and friend Lofty Chiltern (Lee Mead) are present at the time of wedding.

Receptionist Louise Tyler meets with Laila Bertrand (Hannah Barrie), the patient that caused Louise to leave the nursing profession after blaming her for the death of her baby, at a bar. Laila shocks Louise when she tells her she is pregnant again, and believing Louise has only visited her to ask for her forgiveness, a defiant Laila leaves the bar. However, Laila trips and falls over a table and onto shards of broken glass. Louise calls for an ambulance to escort Laila to the emergency department, however she flees the scene of the accident before the paramedics arrive, fearing she will be blamed for the accident. At the emergency department, Dylan treats Laila and informs her that she is not pregnant; the bloated lump on her stomach has been caused by excessive alcohol drinking. Laila forgives Louise, relieving Louise of her guilt. Dylan and clinical nurse manager Rita Freeman (Chloe Howman) then become isolated after a patient displays symptoms of a contagious disease; Dylan is annoyed as he plans to walk Zoe down the aisle. Dylan soon diagnoses the patient with malaria.

At the wedding reception, Zoe and Max are greeted by friends and colleagues, including Dylan and Rita. Max soon notices Zoe and Dylan sharing looks and confronts Zoe, who confesses to cheating on him. Max is heartbroken and ends their marriage, devastating Zoe who flees the reception. She goes to Dylan's boathouse and tells Dylan that she plans to leave; they drive the boathouse away, passing the venue. At the venue, Max begins heavily drinking and when Louis Fairhead (Gregory Forsyth-Foreman) comments on Max and Zoe's marriage, they begin to fight. Lofty and Louis' father, Charlie Fairhead (Derek Thompson), attempt to intervene, but Lofty is pushed into a flame heater, sparking a fire at the venue. Guests begin to flee the reception, while others attempt to control the fire to no avail.

Max fears Zoe is still inside the reception and calls her; she answers. As Dylan tries steering the boat away from the fire, embers float onto the boat, igniting a blanket covering gas canisters and paint. Dylan panics as the flames burst and grow, before agreeing with Zoe to jump from the boat. As they prepare to jump, Dylan returns inside the boathouse to collect his "lucky" talisman, leaving Zoe to jump alone. Zoe flails in the water as the weight of her dress begins to drag her underwater. The boathouse then explodes twice as Zoe shouts for Dylan, shocking those at the venue who are watching.

== Production ==
The episode was the second part of a four-part set of episodes which celebrated the show reaching its thirtieth series. This episode was dedicated to the wedding of popular couple Zoe Hanna and Max Walker. The episode was written by Matthew Barry, directed by Julie Edwards and produced by Gert Thomas. The outcome of the wedding was kept a secret until transmission, however fans were aware that Zoe would keep a secret which would be revealed in the episode finale. Actress Sunetra Sarker said in an interview "nothing can ever be the same" and the secret her character would hide would be "life-changing". Zoe's wedding day was also teased in Casualty's annual Summer trailer.

Series producer Erika Hossington stated in an interview after the dramatic episode had aired that the crew decided to air the storyline because they felt "the path of true love never runs smooth". Hossington then went on in the interview to explain that Zoe's secret was to "turn the tables" because it was "Zoe who was always doubtful and it was Max who always reassured her". The episode was also promoted in an advertisement on BBC One in the build-up to the episode itself.

Casualty also aired a red button special episode in-between Part One and Two of "Forsaking All Others", which was entitled "Mrs Walker-To-Be". The red-button special was written by Sarah Beeson and directed by John Quarrell, and focused on the events which occurred during Zoe's hen night. The red-button episode featured Sunetra Sarker, Jamie Davis, Lee Mead, Amanda Henderson, Chloe Howman, Kazia Pelka and Anthony Dowding.

== Reception ==
The episode attracted an overnight figure of 5.20 million viewers. After seven days this figure increased to 6.16 million viewers. Twenty-eight days later, the episode reached a final total of 6.44 million viewers – the second highest-rated Casualty episode of 2015.

Prior to the episode airing, the Daily Mirror published an article claiming the four-part finale episodes "could be the most dramatic episodes in three decades". After the episode had aired, the Irish Examiner stated that fans had 'been left reeling' and were 'on the edge' following the dramatic cliffhanger. Digital Spy stated fans "could not cope" and had been left with "a lot of feelings following the dramatic cliffhanger, with fans responding to the episode via Twitter. Alison Graham reviewed the episode on Radio Times, telling viewers to be assured that "when you think it's all over – it isn't".
