= Casualty series 29 =

Twenty-ninth series of Casualty

Casualty
- Series 29
- Starring: Matt Bardock; William Beck; Charles Dale; Jamie Davis; Jane Hazlegrove; Amanda Henderson; Chloe Howman; Tony Marshall; Lee Mead; Amanda Mealing; Azuka Oforka; Suzanne Packer; George Rainsford; Patrick Robinson; Sunetra Sarker; Michael Stevenson; Derek Thompson; Charles Venn; Richard Winsor; Crystal Yu
- No. of episodes: 46

Release
- Original network: BBC One; BBC One HD
- Original release: 30 August 2014 – 23 August 2015

Series chronology
- ← Previous; Series 28 Next → Series 30

The twenty−ninth series of the British medical drama television series Casualty commenced airing in the United Kingdom on BBC One on 30 August 2014, and finished on 23 August 2015. The series consisted of 46 episodes. Erika Hossington continued her role as series producer, while Oliver Kent continued his role as the show's executive producer.

Fifteen cast members reprised their roles from the previous series with three long-serving cast members departing during this series. Jane Hazlegrove reprised her role as paramedic Kathleen "Dixie" Dixon in the premiere episode, following a three month absence. Sunetra Sarker, William Beck and Michael Stevenson reprised their roles as ED consultants Zoe Hanna and Dylan Keogh, and paramedic Iain Dean in October 2014. Charles Venn joined the show's main cast in summer 2015 as senior staff nurse Jacob Masters.

This series featured three webisodes. The first two webisodes were a two-parter focusing on main character Noel Garcia pursuing his dream career of being a radio DJ, while the final webisode of the series focused on main characters Zoe Hanna and Max Walker's respective pre-wedding celebrations. On 2 July 2014, it was announced that Casualty would be airing three standalone episodes.

The standalone episodes were noted as being "independent from the main series story arc", as well as making "no reference to ongoing plotlines". An inside source told Casualty the cast and crew called the episodes "Holby Noir". The first episode aired on 15 November 2014, a week later than originally planned, while the second episode aired on 28 March 2015, with the final episode airing on 11 July 2015. In August 2014, series producer Erika Hossington revealed that she had made updates to the style of the show, by looking at, and changing, the cameras the show were shooting on, the format the show was shooting in, and also the lightbulbs used in the studio.

During series twenty-nine, Casualty was awarded the Best Soap and Continuing Drama accolade at the 2015 Royal Television Society awards ceremony. The show also won the Best Drama award at the 2015 Inside Soap Awards. Throughout the series, the show was also shortlisted under the Best Family Drama award at the 2015 TV Choice Awards, however it was beaten by Call the Midwife. In addition to this, the Casualty production team were shortlisted under the Best Television Soap and Continuing Drama category at the 2015 BAFTA awards. Actor Lee Mead was nominated under the category Newcomer for his portrayal of his character Lofty Chiltern at the National Television Awards 2015, however did not win the award.

== Production ==
Oliver Kent continued his role as executive producer, while Erika Hossington remained as series producer. This series consisted of 46 episodes. In addition to this, this series featured three webisodes. The first two webisodes, "Radio Holby", were a two-part story that aired on 18 October and 25 October 2014, following the broadcast of episodes seven and eight respectively.

The story featured receptionist Noel Garcia (Marshall) deciding to pursue his dream of being a radio DJ while "hoping to boost the atmosphere of the ED" as he takes over the hospital's radio station. The webisodes were created by the show's junior editorial team with Ross Southard leading the idea. Hossington praised the behind-the-scenes team and expressed her delight at the webisodes being commissioned, saying, "Everyone who worked on the webisodes stepped up a level, and with their passion, enthusiasm and dedication totally focused on making the best finished project.

The end result is a real treat for our website visitors and fans." The final webisode, "Mrs Walker-To-Be", centered around the characters of Zoe Hanna (Sarker) and Max Walker (Davis) as they went on their respective pre-wedding celebrations and was published online on 22 August 2015, following the broadcast of episode forty-five.

On 2 July 2014, Radio Times revealed plans for the show to air three standalone episodes. The standalone episodes were noted as being "independent from the main series story arc", as well as making "no reference to ongoing plotlines". It was reported that an inside source from the show branded the standalone episodes as "really stylish", as well as calling the episodes "Casualty Noir".

More information about the standalone episodes were revealed in August 2014, during an interview with series producer Erika Hossington, who said that the episodes were devised to "give the audience a treat of a different kind". In addition to this, the episodes were created by former show scriptwriters, in an attempt to "tempt back some of Casualty's writing alumni who had gone onto bigger and better things".

The first standalone episode was supposed to be broadcast on 1 November 2014, however the episode was later moved to 15 November 2014, for unknown reasons. The episode, entitled "Deadfall", was written by Jeff Povey and directed by David Innes Edwards, and featured main character Lily Chao (Yu) solving a murder mystery.

The second episode was broadcast on 28 March 2015, entitled "The Road Not Taken". It was written by Barbara Machin and directed by Ian Barnes. This episode featured main character Zoe Hanna (Sarker) wondering how different life could be if she made one difference to her day. The final standalone episode, entitled "Holby Sin City", aired on 11 July 2015, and was written by Mark Catley and directed by Simon Massey. The episode featured main character Ethan Hardy (Rainsford) solving a mysterious murder case.

In August 2014, Hossington revealed in an interview with Digital Spy that her main aims for Casualty since taking over were to focus the show on "the characters who the audience really loved" and to see more "interest and compelling" guest stories. As well as moving the show's focus back to character-based storylines and reintroducing compelling guest stories, Hossington also revealed that there were "certain aspects" of the show which she felt were "out of date in terms of what the show looked like".

Hossington told Digital Spy that she looked at everything: from the cameras the show were shooting on, to the format the show was shooting in, as well as changing the light bulbs in the studio.

== Cast ==
The twenty-ninth series of Casualty featured a cast of characters working in the emergency department of Holby City Hospital. The majority of the cast from the previous series continued to appear in this series. Amanda Mealing appeared as the clinical lead and a consultant in emergency medicine Connie Beauchamp, whilst Patrick Robinson appeared as consultant Martin "Ash" Ashford. George Rainsford and Richard Winsor portrayed specialist registrars Ethan Hardy and Caleb "Cal" Knight. Crystal Yu starred as a doctor undergoing the first, and later second, year of core training Lily Chao. Derek Thompson continued his role of senior charge nurse and emergency nurse practitioner Charlie Fairhead, whilst Suzanne Packer appeared as clinical nurse manager and ward sister, later just ward sister Tess Bateman. Chloe Howman portrayed staff nurse and later, senior staff nurse and clinical nurse manager/ward sister Rita Freeman, whilst Amanda Henderson and Lee Mead starred as staff nurses Robyn Miller and Ben "Lofty" Chiltern. Charles Dale portrayed emergency care assistant, and later healthcare assistant, Mackenzie "Big Mac" Chalker. Jamie Davis continued his role of porter Max Walker, whilst Tony Marshall and Azuka Oforka appeared as receptionists Noel Garcia and Louise Tyler. Matt Bardock and Gemma Atkinson starred as paramedics Jeff Collier and Tamzin Bayle, with the latter appearing in a recurring capacity.

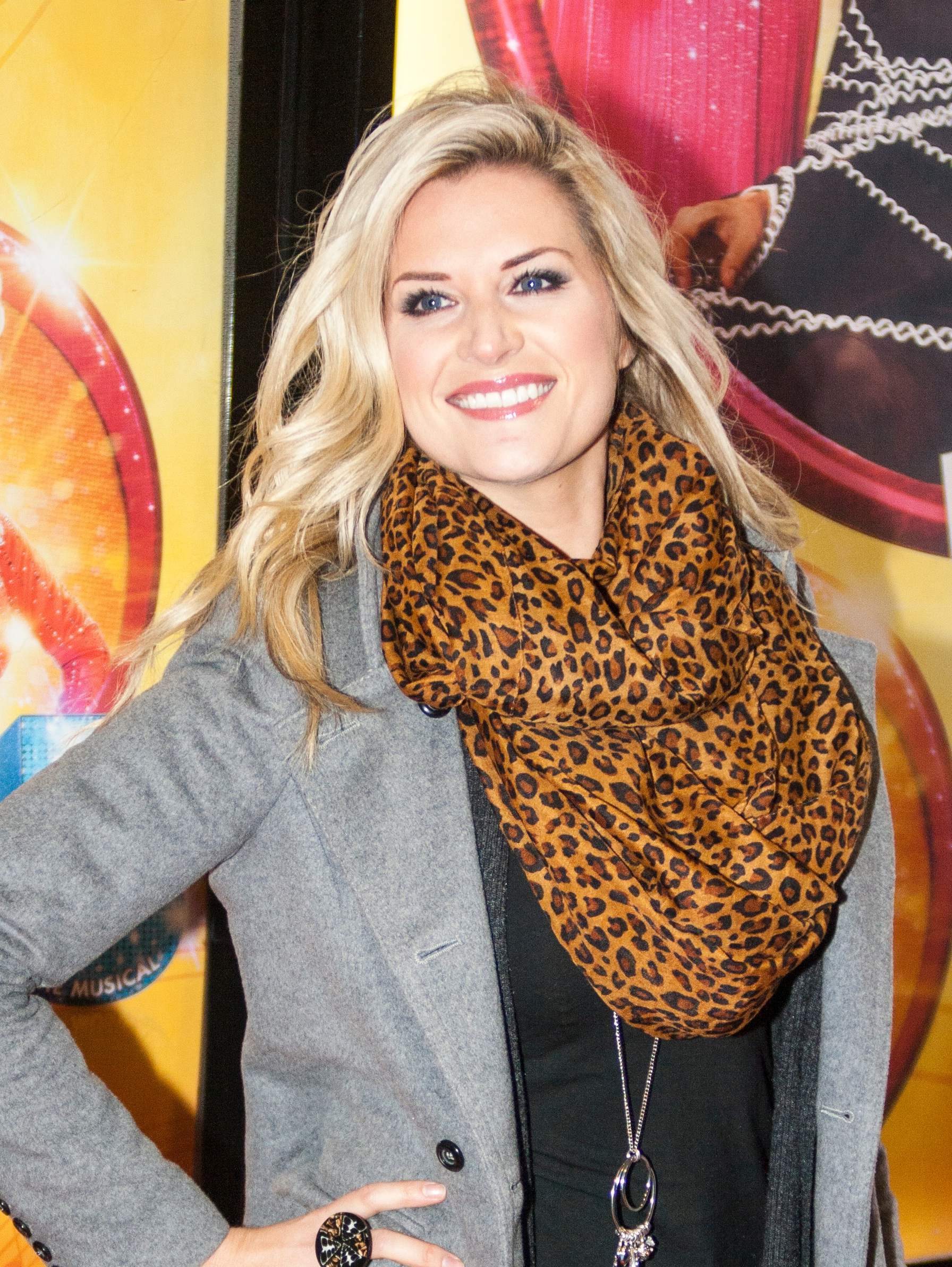
Sarah-Jayne Dunn appeared in seven episodes as Taylor Ashbie, a love interest for Cal.

Chelsee Healey's casting in the role of barista Honey Wright was announced on 19 May 2014. She was billed as having "big hair and a big personality". She made her first appearance in episode six, broadcast on 11 October. Healey signed a four-month contract and departed at its conclusion in episode twenty-one, broadcast on 14 February 2015.

Healey returned to filming in spring 2015 and Honey returned in episode forty-one, broadcast on 25 July 2016. A trailer previewing "dramatic Winter episodes" was released on 4 October 2014 including the introduction of Connie's daughter Grace Beauchamp. Emily Carey's agency revealed that she had been cast in the role of Grace. Grace made her first appearance during episode twelve, broadcast on 29 November 2014. Frances Tomelty and Sarah Jayne Dunn were announced to be joining the show in August 2014 by series producer Erika Hossington.

Tomelty's agent and Dunn's official website revealed they had been cast as Audrey and Taylor respectively. Audrey is introduced as the grandmother of Grace, whilst Taylor is a love interest for Cal Knight. Both characters made their first appearance in episode thirteen, broadcast on 6 December 2014.

Carey and Tomelty departed from the series in episode eighteen, broadcast on 24 January 2015, whilst Dunn departed in episode twenty-nine, broadcast on 18 April 2015, at the conclusion of the storyline which saw her revealed to be conning Cal. Charles Venn was announced to be joining the cast as nurse Jacob Masters. Venn described his casting as "a pleasure and honour" and Kent said he was "thrilled" to welcome Venn. Venn's debut episode – the fortieth episode of the series – was broadcast on 18 July 2015, a week later than originally planned.

Bardock announced his decision to leave his role of Jeff Collier on 30 June 2014, following seven years on the show. Following Bardock's choice to leave the serial, Atkinson announced she would also depart with Tamzin leaving at the conclusion of her storyline. Bardock's final scenes aired in episode five, broadcast on 4 October 2014, when Jeff was killed in a car explosion as part of a "shock twist".

Atkinson made her final appearance in the following episode, broadcast on 11 October 2014, when Tamzin opted to resign following Jeff's death. Robinson's departure from the serial was announced in episode fifteen, broadcast on 3 January 2015, following the show's return from the Christmas break, although it was not screened. Packer's decision to quit her role was revealed in April 2015, although it was not confirmed by BBC. Luke Bailey reprised his role as Tess' son, Sam Bateman, for one episode to aid Tess' departure storyline. They departed in episode forty-four, broadcast on 15 August 2015, but Tess made a cameo appearance in the following episode.

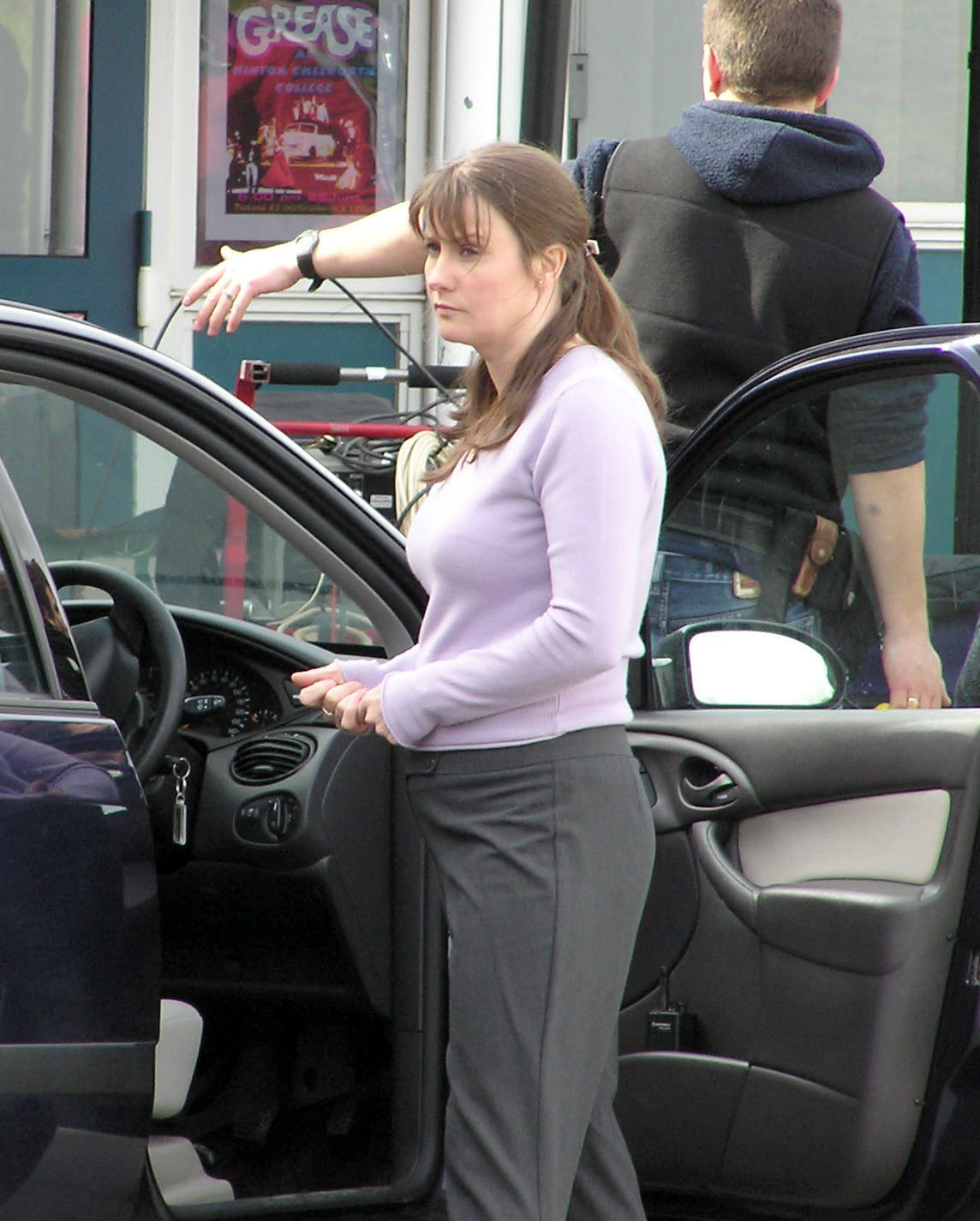
Maggie Coldwell actress Susan Cookson reprised her role in episode twenty-six.

Jane Hazlegrove and Sunetra Sarker temporarily departed from their respective roles of paramedic Kathleen "Dixie" Dixon and consultant Zoe Hanna in the previous series. Hazlegrove returned in episode one, broadcast on 30 August 2014, and Sarker returned in episode eight, broadcast on 25 October 2014.

Hossington previously teased the return of a "top secret" character, who returned alongside Sarker. The character was revealed as Dylan Keogh (William Beck) during the episode's broadcast, who was last seen in 2012. Episode six, broadcast on 11 October 2014, saw the return of Jamie Collier (Daniel Anthony) and Iain Dean (Michael Stevenson) who both appeared for Jeff's funeral. Stevenson, who previously appeared on the show for six months in 2013, subsequently joined the show's main cast.

Hossington explained that Iain and Dixie would begin a partnership which would be "fun" to create. Mark Letheren made four guest appearances throughout the series as counsellor Ben Harding, a role he has played on-off since 2007. Susan Cookson reprised her role as Maggie Coldwell in episode twenty-six for a non-canon storyline which saw Maggie invite Zoe to join the Air Ambulance service. Gregory Forsyth-Foreman returned to the show as Louis Fairhead in episode thirty-two for a storyline which saw Louis become addicted to drugs.

Hossington confirmed in an interview with Digital Spy that Holby City characters, Guy Self (John Michie) and Elliot Hope (Paul Bradley), would appear in the series. Despite stating Guy would "pop up quite a lot", he only appeared in episode seven. Elliot made a cameo appearance in episode one. Following their returns to Holby City in October 2014 and April 2015 respectively, Michael Spence (Hari Dhillon) and Henrik Hanssen (Guy Henry) featured in one episode of Casualty each.

Zach Manley (Aleksy Komorowski) was introduced in episode thirty-one as a love interest for Robyn. He departed in episode thirty-eight at the conclusion of the storyline. Greta Miller (Kazia Pelka), the mother of Max, was introduced in episode forty-one. She departed in episode forty-six, having appeared in the Red Button special, "Mrs Walker-To-Be". Matthew Marsh guest appeared in episode forty-three as Brian Carroll, Dylan's father, alongside Vicky Hall who appeared as Brian's partner Hazel Leyton.

=== Main characters ===
- Matt Bardock as Jeff Collier (until episode 5)
- William Beck as Dylan Keogh (from episode 8)
- Charles Dale as Big Mac
- Jamie Davis as Max Walker
- Jane Hazlegrove as Kathleen "Dixie" Dixon
- Amanda Henderson as Robyn Miller
- Chloe Howman as Rita Freeman
- Tony Marshall as Noel Garcia
- Lee Mead as Ben "Lofty" Chiltern
- Amanda Mealing as Connie Beauchamp
- Azuka Oforka as Louise Tyler
- Suzanne Packer as Tess Bateman (until episode 45)
- George Rainsford as Ethan Hardy
- Patrick Robinson as Martin "Ash" Ashford (until episode 14)
- Sunetra Sarker as Zoe Hanna
- Michael Stevenson as Iain Dean (from episode 6)
- Derek Thompson as Charlie Fairhead
- Charles Venn as Jacob Masters (from episode 40)
- Richard Winsor as Caleb Knight
- Crystal Yu as Lily Chao

=== Recurring characters ===
- Gemma Atkinson as Tamzin Bayle (until episode 6)
- Emily Carey as Grace Beauchamp
- Sarah Jayne Dunn as Taylor Ashbie
- Gregory Forsyth-Foreman as Louis Fairhead (from episode 32)
- Chelsee Healey as Honey Wright (episodes 6−21, from episode 41)
- Frances Tomelty as Audrey Strachan

=== Guest characters ===
- Daniel Anthony as Jamie Collier (episode 6)
- Luke Bailey as Sam Bateman (episode 44)
- Paul Bradley as Elliot Hope
- Michelle Collins as Samantha Kellman
- Susan Cookson as Maggie Coldwell (episode 26)
- Hari Dhillon as Michael Spence
- Vicky Hall as Hazel Leyton
- Guy Henry as Henrik Hanssen
- Aleksy Komorowski as Zach Manley
- Mark Letheren as Ben Harding
- Matthew Marsh as Brian Carroll
- John Michie as Guy Self
- Kazia Pelka as Greta Miller
- Georgia Tennant as Briony Whitman (episode 9)

== Episodes ==
No. overall	No. in series	Title	Directed by	Written by	Original release date	UK viewers (millions)
916	1	"Learning to Fly"	Nigel Douglas	Tony McHale	30 August 2014	4.90
Jeff is given a shock when he learns Samantha has been keeping her imprisoned husband a secret from him. Jeff is adamant he did not know about him, but a violent fight develops between the pair. Samantha grabs a kitchen knife and stabs her husband. As the trio arrive at the ED, Samantha's deception is soon exposed to the staff at the hospital. Charlie returns home from New Zealand, but Connie is concerned about Charlie's interest in his job. She raises her concerns with Tess and Ash, but is unaware that Charlie has made a secret appointment with cardiothoracic consultant Elliot Hope, who believes Charlie has a high risk of angina. Max helps a young couple make their family see they are in love following an accident near an aviary farm.
917	2	"Fallen Stars"	David Innes Edwards	Anita Pandolfo	6 September 2014	4.65
Rita treats a patient admitted after falling down a flight of stairs. Rita's patient claims she was about to be raped by her fitness instructor, but Rita soon learns that her patient is being dishonest, and loses her temper. Rita's day only gets worse when Tess queries her about being late to work, and Ash finds her drinking during her shift. Ash sends Rita home, wondering whether to tell Connie about her drinking. Tess is encouraged by Connie to recommend a retirement plan for Charlie. Charlie becomes irritable towards Tess when he learns of her intentions. Cal helps a teenage patient come to terms with her HIV diagnosis. Max finds himself helping a rock star reveal his drug addiction to his family and friends.
918	3	"Home"	Joss Agnew	Mark Catley	20 September 2014	4.78
Connie is surprised by the return of her former boss, Andrea Somerton, at the same time a young heart patient is admitted to the ED. Connie notices that Andrea is quick to undermine her when she suggests that their young patient does not have life-saving surgery immediately because he is too weak. As Andrea continues to go ahead with her plan to operate on her patient, Connie learns Andrea is not fit herself to be working for much longer, and helps Andrea see sense about her own physical health. Lofty becomes concerned about the mental state of a young man with an abscess in his mouth. Dixie makes her opinions about Tamzin and Jeff's relationship clear to Jeff. She tells Jeff that she does not trust Tamzin. Ash keeps quiet about Rita's drinking and covers a shift for her. Charlie is unamused as he is given the day off work, and decides to spends it hanging around the ED.
919	4	"Go Out and Get Busy"	Nigel Douglas	Matthew Barry	27 September 2014	4.90
Robyn writes down false information in a patient's allergy notes and Connie finds out. Connie gives Robyn a warning and tells her to improve her skills. Then, at a wedding, the floor collapses and the bride is trapped under rubble. Charlie returns to work and decides that Robyn should be given the opportunity to go and attend the incident with Ethan and the paramedics. Lofty treats and discharges a deaf woman with minor injuries, but she returns with a nasty facial injury. Upon her return, Lofty uses creative thinking to help his patient speak out about her domestic abuse. Max notices a teenager with abdominal pains needs a life lesson, and helps her realise her potential.
920	5	"Born Lucky"	Steve Hughes	Kevin Rundle	4 October 2014	5.75
Connie takes several members of the team from the ED on a road trip in the minibus to help motivate a nearby failing hospital. A father and daughter have an argument at a farmhouse, and the father drives off in anger. While the team are on their way, the father crashes into the side of the minibus, throwing it to its side. Connie and her team are all seriously injured as a result of the collision. Jeff, Dixie and Tamzin arrive on the scene and Tamzin helps take Lily, Rita, Tess and Ethan back to the ED. Cal is annoyed by his patient when she teases him about a one-night stand the pair had a few years ago, but is soon distressed to learn about the severity of Ethan's condition as his brother is in need of an operation. Back at the minibus, Jeff manages to free Ash as he becomes stuck in the minibus, and as Dixie helps remove Ash from the minibus, the minibus explodes, killing Jeff.
921	6	"The Last Call"	Steve Hughes	Emma Goodwin	11 October 2014	5.48
Dixie struggles to keep her emotions together as the day of Jeff's funeral arrives. When an alcoholic falls into a wheelie bin and ends up at a landfill site, Dixie attends the call-out instead of attending Jeff's funeral. Iain Dean returns for Jeff's funeral, but when he learns Dixie is not planning on attending, he goes to see Dixie and aid her in rescuing the alcoholic. Iain persuades Dixie to say goodbye to Jeff. Jamie Collier also returns for the funeral. At the ED, new barista Honey Wright begins her first day. Lofty treats an OCD patient who has washed her hands in bleach.
922	7	"The Index Case"	Joss Agnew	Steve Bailie	18 October 2014	4.90
Connie and the team remain in turmoil following Jeff's death, so Connie tells the team that their shift will be shorter than usual. Guy offers Connie counselling as he notices she is struggling to focus, but Connie refuses his offer. Later, a patient dies under mysterious circumstances in the ED, under Connie's care. When the patient's daughter, Hailey, files a complaint against Connie, she is left questioning whether she missed something. Ash wonders if Dixie blames him for Jeff's death, as she continues to grieve for him. Cal, Charlie, Ash and Ethan work together as a team to connect two patients who both have a rare virus.
923	8	"Return to Sender"	Matthew Evans	Matthew Barry	25 October 2014	5.07
Zoe returns to the ED and is surprised to learn that none of the staff were notified of her return. She learns of Jeff's death and supports her colleagues as they continue to grieve for Jeff. Connie has another complaint made against her as she attempts to talk to Hailey again and convince her to drop her complaint. Dixie's emotions continue to overwhelm her at the hospital station, and when she heads over to the ED, she finds Ash and confronts him in front of the whole hospital, telling him that it should have been him who died instead of Jeff. Lofty treats a teenage patient with sickle cell anaemia who later suffers a stroke. After her shift is over, Zoe returns to the boathouse, where she is greeted by Dylan Keogh, who is planning to return to the ED.
924	9	"Entrenched"	Matthew Evans	Dale Overton	1 November 2014	5.35
Rita is promoted to senior staff nurse. In Holby, it is the local football derby day, and fans are getting ready, by drinking before the game at the local pub. When the rival team enter the pub and a violent fight breaks out between all the supporters, both teams end up at the ED. Zoe and Rita try their best to keep both teams separated from each other, but then a flare is set off in cubicles, badly burning one of the supporters. A young boy in cubicles suffers an asthma attack from the smoke inhalation. Lofty stays in the ED while the staff and patients are evacuated, but the young boy dies. Lofty is branded a hero by his colleagues. Big Mac continues to grieve with Dixie over Jeff's death. After a difficult day, Big Mac transfers back to the ED as a healthcare assistant.
925	10	"Deadfall"	David Innes Edwards	Jeff Povey	15 November 2014	5.06
Charlie, on the way to work for a night shift, comes across a couple who have crashed their car into the back of a truck. Charlie helps the paramedics admit the pair to the ED, but on the way there, the man goes into cardiac arrest and dies. Lily calls the man's death in the ED, but has her suspicions over whether he was murdered or not. She decides to investigate the man's death further, and when his partner later also dies, Lily is sure a killer is on the loose. She calls the police. When they arrive, one of the officers begins to act suspiciously. Lily uses her instinct to get to the bottom of the mystery, but she puts her life in danger as the killer goes to murder a third victim. She successfully manages to get the murderer arrested, and impresses Ethan and Charlie with her detective skills. This episode was dedicated to Rebekah Gibbs, who portrayed paramedic Nina Farr between 2004 and 2006.
926	11	"Asylum"	Julie Edwards	Henrietta Hardy	22 November 2014	4.61
Ash loses his temper in Resus when an asylum seeker who was admitted after falling down a flight of stairs refuses a blood transfusion because she is a Jehovah's witness. Connie calls Ash out on his unacceptable behaviour and sends him for counselling. Dixie takes Jeff's ashes to the beach and scatters them as she begins to accept the reality of his death. Dylan works alongside Ethan to help put a teenage patient at ease when she is concerned she has ovarian cancer. Big Mac starts his first shift as a healthcare assistant and helps a man reunite with his long-lost daughter.
927	12	"Losing Grip"	Julie Edwards	Asher Pirie	29 November 2014	4.76
Connie is forced to bring her daughter Grace into work when she is expelled from her school, however it appears Connie is unaware of the trouble her daughter is capable of. Ash is angered by a reckless teenager's lifestyle choices when he is admitted after falling from a container. As Ash lashes out at the teenager, Charlie gets in the way, and forces him to realise the dangers his actions are having on the patients and staff. Dixie realises the effect her blaming Ash for Jeff's death has had on him, and apologises. Honey is shocked when Ethan discovers she is a pole dancer in her spare time.
928	13	"Feeling Good"	Steve Brett	Matthew Barry	6 December 2014	4.72
Ash's desperation to save all his patients lives leads Connie to pairing him up with Dylan. The pair work together on a suspected overdose patient, but Ash disagrees with Dylan on how to treat their patient. Audrey Strachan, Grace's grandmother, arrives when another one of Grace's nannies quit following her recent bad behaviour. Zoe treats Taylor Ashbie, a patient admitted after complaining of chest pains. She becomes annoyed with Cal when he begins flirting with Taylor whilst on shift. The paramedics receive a hamper basket addressed to Jeff, but are shocked by its contents.
929	14	"Solomon's Song"	Steve Brett	Jeff Povey	13 December 2014	4.46
Noel is given the shock of his life when Honey reveals to him that she is his long-lost daughter. Ash, Charlie, Dixie and Iain attend a call-out to a cathedral when a chandelier collapses during a Christmas carol service. After the congregation are taken back to the ED for treatment, Ash reaches a decision about his future at Holby City, and discreetly leaves. Lofty and Lily treat a patient convinced he is Jesus. Connie and Grace's relationship continues to strain as Connie prioritises patients over her.
930	15	"Next Year's Words"	David Tucker	Kelly Jones	3 January 2015	5.51
Connie has a meeting with social services regarding her treatment of Grace, and when she learns that someone phoned social services and reported her, Connie is quick to blame her colleagues. Connie's problems later escalate when footage of the formerly chaotic ED surface on social media. She is quick to blame Zoe, forgetting that Hailey is still out for revenge over her father's death. Charlie picks Connie up on her brash behaviour, and offers her support as she continues to struggle with the prospect of losing Grace. Honey and Noel continue to bond following her revelation. Lofty is in high spirits for the new year, and records his staff's resolutions. Zoe is confronted with familiar patient – alcoholic Molly Drover – who is intent on giving up on life.
931	16	"Clinging On"	David Tucker	Kit Lambert	10 January 2015	6.06
Connie finds herself torn between spending time with Grace and treating a demanding patient. When she prioritises her demanding patient over Grace, Grace tells Connie she wants to live with Audrey instead of her, leaving Connie devastated. Tess hands in her resignation as clinical nurse manager. Rita struggles to decide whether she is fit to apply for the role, but with encouragement from Lofty, she goes ahead and applies for the position. The video footage of the chaotic ED surfaces with the news, leaving Connie with a new dilemma over the ED's reputation. Zoe treats an elderly man for scurvy. She decides to talk with Max about her experience with her patient, but catches him kissing a nurse in the store room.
932	17	"Muddling Through"	David Beauchamp	Gillian Richmond	17 January 2015	6.19
Connie finds herself struggling without Grace, but it is the day of her court case against Hailey, and she is intent on winning the battle. After seeing Hailey outside the ED, Connie talks with her, and realises that grief caused her to act irrationally. The pair talk about Hailey's father's death, and decide to drop the case against each other. Ethan treats a patient who is hallucinating after taking LSD, but becomes concerned for her safety when he finds a mysterious scar on her abdomen. Robyn treats a poor family who cannot feed their children. She decides she needs to be more helpful and so sets up a food bank at the ED.
933	18	"The Last Goodbye"	David Innes Edwards	Mark Catley & Tom Higgins	24 January 2015	6.19
Rita's first day in the role of clinical nurse manager gets off to a bad start when her paedophile ex-husband Mark arrives at the ED to talk to her, having been released from prison. When Grace goes missing and Connie cannot find her, she accuses Mark of abducting her. Grace is later found safely, and travels back to the USA with Audrey. Connie is heartbroken, and takes her anger out on Rita, promising her that her days in the ED are numbered. Honey sprains her ankle whilst re-auditioning at the pole dancing club. She calls on Ethan to discreetly help her out, and afterwards, the pair almost share a kiss.
934	19	"What a Difference a Day Makes"	David Innes Edwards	Suzie Smith	31 January 2015	6.02
Big Mac finds himself in a pawn shop as his financial situation worsens. While he is there, a window cleaner is stabbed in the leg. He helps stem the bleed of the window cleaner until the paramedics arrive, and once back at the ED, Big Mac learns that he is not the only one who is struggling financially. Lofty helps a fractured family come to terms with the death of a loved one. Tess returns to work as a nurse following her stint at an urgent care centre. Connie uses work as a getaway following Grace's return to the USA. Ethan and Honey remain close following Honey's accident.
935	20	"Front Line"	Michael Owen Morris	Joe Williams	7 February 2015	6.22
Connie is full of optimism as inspection day arrives at the ED. However, when a computer hacker is admitted after falling over, Robyn uses his memory stick believing she is helping him, but instead spreads a virus to the computers of the ED. As chaos begins to prevail, the staff pull together and ensure the ED passes its inspection. Rita treats two soldiers injured in an explosion at an Army range, but becomes overinvolved in their situation when she learns one of the soldiers is lying. Zoe helps Max realise he means much more to the ED than just being a porter, leading to the pair sharing a kiss. Honey catches Big Mac stealing food from the food bank, and learns of his financial struggles.
936	21	"Sweetie"	Michael Owen Morris	Sally Abbott	14 February 2015	6.07
Rita and the team treat two patients, Susie Reardon and Olive Russell, who are admitted following a deliberate car collision. However, when the staff learn that Olive is a serial child killer, and Susie's daughter was a victim, Rita puts her whole career in jeopardy by letting Susie visit Olive. Connie encourages Dylan to return to the ED full time as a consultant when a vacancy for the role comes up – and at the same time she asks Cal to hand in his resignation, although is unsuccessful. Robyn sends Lofty an anonymous valentine's day card as her feelings for him continue to grow. Honey and Ethan share a goodbye kiss when Honey learns her grandmother is in need of a carer after injuring herself at home.
937	22	"Sweet Little Lies"	Julie Edwards	Lucia Haynes	21 February 2015	5.77
Dylan and Lofty treat a patient admitted after suffering severe stomach cramps at work. Dylan's concerns for his patient quickly grow when the patient's colleague tells him she has only recently overcome cancer, but when he looks in her medical files, he learns that his patient is lying to him. Connie treats a teenager with Tourette's syndrome and helps her acknowledge she needs to seek help after she crashes her car. Lily becomes irritated by a self-admitted patient who is convinced her dog is psychic and is able to sense her illness.
938	23	"Something to Live For"	Julie Edwards	Stephen McAteer	28 February 2015	5.86
Dixie and Iain find themselves on a dangerous call-out when a caravan hangs precariously over the edge of a cliff. Iain risks his life to save a young boy from inside the caravan, just seconds before the cliff edge collapses. Once back at the ED, a drug scandal unfolds between the patients from the caravan site. Connie befriends well-known patient Alfred Maxwell, who is admitted suffering motor neurone disease. Her happiness in finding a new friend in Alfred is soon cut short when Alfred reveals he wants to end his life. Max decides he wants his and Zoe's secret relationship to become public, but Zoe is not keen. Despite this, the pair end up revealing to the staff they are a couple.
939	24	"Excess Baggage"	Rebecca Gatward	Emma Goodwin	7 March 2015	6.15
Lily works excessive hours in the ED to try and ease the pressure on the staff. Exhausted, she treats a male with an arrow stuck in his bottom, but she faints while she is treating him, leaving Dylan extremely concerned for her own health. Dylan offers to pay for a taxi to get Lily home safely, but she is insistent on driving her moped home. While Lily is driving home, she falls asleep on her moped. Iain receives a verbal warning from Dixie when he flirts with his patients inappropriately. Connie and Rita have a meeting, but when Rita holds the meeting up a little longer than expected, Connie misses her chance to say goodbye to Alfred, who is being discharged from the ED, and furiously blames Rita.
940	25	"Toxic Relationships"	Rebecca Gatward	Anita Pandolfo & Mark Stevenson	14 March 2015	6.07
Lily falls asleep on her moped having been sent home from work due to exhaustion. Her moped collides with a schoolgirl, and both are admitted with injuries. At the ED, the staff learn of Lily's involvement in the accident, potentially jeopardising her career. The schoolgirl's father angrily blames Lily for his daughter's injuries, although he later receives a shock himself when he learns his daughter deliberately stepped in front of Lily's moped. Rita is furious at the senior members of staff in the ED when nurses begin missing their lunch breaks because they are completing additional tasks outside their job description. She tells the nurses to start a rebellion against the senior staff at the ED. Cal steals money from Ethan in order to help contribute towards Taylor's newly set-up charity.
941	26	"The Road Not Taken"	Ian Barnes	Barbara Machin	28 March 2015	5.88
Three alternate timelines for the same day: 1. Zoe receives a video call from Maggie. She goes to work and is torn between treating a six year-old girl run over by her father or a pregnant woman who fears her baby is coming. She prioritises the six year-old girl, but she dies. On the way home, the pregnant woman suffers contractions, causing her ex-boyfriend to be distracted, resulting in a car crash. When they return to the hospital, Zoe must choose whether to perform a caesarian or REBOA – she picks the REBOA; however both the mother and baby die. Zoe wonders what the outcome would be if she retook her day.; 2. Zoe retakes her day, this time prioritising the pregnant woman. The six-year-old girl dies. On the way home the pregnant woman is again involved in a car crash and admitted. This time, Zoe performs a caesarian. The baby survives but the mother dies. Zoe wonders what the outcome would be if she had gotten up earlier.; 3. Zoe gets up half an hour earlier: this time everything goes right – the six year-old survives, and so do the mother and baby.
942	27	"Something Borrowed, Something Blue"	Jo Johnson	Paul Matthew Thompson	4 April 2015	5.80
Connie is surprised when Alfred is readmitted to the ED after he and his friend are involved in a car crash. Helping make Alfred as comfortable as she can when his condition begins to drastically deteriorate, Connie is left horrified when Alfred asks her to help him die. Ethan is shocked to learn that £15,000 has gone missing from his bank account. Cal reveals it was him who stole the money in order to help fund Taylor's charity. Cal is later disturbed when he is jilted by Taylor, who disappears with all of the charity money, having conned him and Ethan. Iain decides to apply for a rapid respondent position away from Holby City.
943	28	"Under Pressure"	Jo Johnson	Kate Verghese	11 April 2015	5.34
Connie wakes up next to Alfred's hospital bed, having spent the night with him. As she prepares to go to work, Alfred's carer informs Connie that Alfred is refusing to take his medication, and that his health is deteriorating faster than the nurses thought. During her shift, Connie receives a call from the care home, who ask her to visit Alfred immediately when he loses his ability to talk. When Connie arrives, she uses a new method of communication to talk to Alfred; he once again asks her to help him die. Connie later returns to the ED and steals benzodiazepine tablets from the medical cabinet. Cal is heartbroken following Taylor's abrupt departure, and apologises to Ethan for stealing his money. However, Cal later steals more money from Ethan when he finds himself a new woman. Dixie convinces Iain to not take his new job and remain at Holby City.
944	29	"The King's Crossing"	Seán Gleeson	Andy Bayliss	18 April 2015	5.02
Connie learns Alfred has been readmitted to the ED, now suffering pneumonia. Rita asks Charlie to intravenously medicate Alfred when he refuses oral medication, but Connie overhears the pair and orders that Alfred is not to be given any medication. Connie claims Alfred has a DNR, but Rita fails to find one. Alfred later dies in the ED, but Rita is not convinced that Connie was not involved in his death, and orders a toxicology screening. The results reveal traces of benzodiazepines in Alfred's body. Rita calls the police and Connie is arrested on suspicion of murder. Cal finds Taylor with a knife in her leg in a public toilet. He calls upon Ethan and the pair treat Taylor. She is later arrested, resulting in a fight between Cal and Ethan. The pair later make up, as Ethan helps Cal realise he is better off without Taylor in his life.
945	30	"The Rita Supremacy"	Seán Gleeson	Jeff Povey	25 April 2015	5.49
Connie is interrogated by the police following her arrest. Connie admits that she gave Alfred benzodiazepines, but is insistent she did not overdose him on them. Connie tells the police she has the box of medication given to Alfred on her desk, and the police go searching for it. Before the police can get to the medication, Rita finds it and hides it, determined to see Connie go down for murder. The police search for the box of medication is unsuccessful and Connie is charged with the murder of Alfred. Lofty treats a patient with an infected tattoo. He helps his patient realise that she is better off without her boyfriend, and the pair later share a kiss. Robyn witnesses the kiss, and is upset, having fancied Lofty.
946	31	"The Department of Secrets"	Simon Massey	Paul Matthew Thompson	2 May 2015	5.31
Connie is suspended by the Holby Trust board over the severity of the allegations made against her. Charlie is disturbed upon learning Connie has not been granted bail, and confronts Rita over her hiding the medication from the police. Charlie eventually manages to convince Rita to hand over the medication to the police, freeing Connie from prison and leading to the murder charges against her being dropped. Charlie offers to take Connie back to the ED. Upon returning to the ED, Charlie receives a phone call from Sofia, his son, Louis’s, girlfriend. Sofia tells Charlie Louis is in Bucharest and desperately needs his help. Connie agrees to travel out to Romania with Charlie, and the pair head to the airport.
947	32	"Exile"	Steve Hughes	Kelly Jones	16 May 2015	5.28
Charlie and Connie arrive in Bucharest, Romania, on a mission to save Louis. When Charlie arrives at the hospital Louis has been admitted to, he is stunned to learn that Louis is a heroin addict and has been involved in illegal gang activities. Louis is angered by his father's unexpected arrival, and makes an escape in his drug dealer's car. Charlie then learns that Louis is planning on selling his kidney in order to pay his debts. Charlie and Connie race to save Louis from selling his kidney. They stop the operation and Charlie attempts to save Louis from Cristian, his drug dealer. As Cristian gets increasingly violent, Charlie speeds away in his car, closely followed by Cristian. The pair manage to escape and Charlie takes Louis back to Holby City.
948	33	"Against the Odds"	Graeme Harper	Steve Bailie	30 May 2015	5.28
Charlie returns from Bucharest with Louis and is concerned for his wellbeing. Dylan is appointed the role of clinical lead in Connie's unexpected absence. A young skateboarder, Marcus, steals from an arcade, run by a belligerent manager. As events take a dramatic turn and a number of casualties are admitted to the ED, Lily finds herself having to help her patient escape a wager placed on her mother against her on her odds of survival.
949	34	"Fix You"	Graeme Harper	Mark Stevenson	6 June 2015	4.71
Dylan struggles to compose himself as the stress of the role of clinical lead begins to take its toll on him. After having a stern conversation with Hanssen, Dylan finds the courage to ensure that he can make the ED the best it can be while he is in charge, although his goals are cut short when Connie unexpectedly returns. Cal and Ethan work together to dissuade a young man from taking his mother, who they are treating, to Finland to take part in a conned clinical trial. Zoe and Max move into a flat together as their relationship continues to progress.
950	35	"The Way Home"	Steve Brett	Jon Sen	13 June 2015	5.06
Dylan finds he has lost his confidence following Connie's return to the ED. He works alongside Zoe to treat two friends who are admitted after becoming entangled together in barbed wire whilst on a training exercise. Later, a third patient is admitted after her foot is caught in an animal trap. It turns out the training exercise is botched, and when one of patients die under Dylan's care, in bay four of Resus, Dylan finds himself getting worked up. Connie returns to work and decides to take on a different leadership approach after learning Rita set her up for murder, although she soon realises her tough approach is necessary if the ED is to improve. Louie is attacked by a group of druggies, which results in his heroin addiction becoming well-known among the staff in the ED, much to Charlie's disappointment.
951	36	"The Golden Hours"	Steve Brett	Jude Tindall	20 June 2015	5.08
Dixie and Iain attend a call-out to a patient who has crashed her car into some bushes. When they admit the patient to the ED, they discover that she also had her baby son in the car, and that he has gone missing. Reports come in from around Holby City of an unstable lady named Suzy, who is thought to have abducted a child as she grieves to come to terms for the loss of her own child. Dixie then finds herself in a delicate situation as she finds Suzy at the edge of Holby Pier with their former patient's son. Charlie gives Louis a wake-up call by taking him to see a dead drug addict's body. Louis breaks down as he realises he needs help, and so Charlie locks Louis in the attic of his home.
952	37	"A Moment of Clarity"	Claire Winyard	Claire Miller	27 June 2015	5.08
Charlie continues to help Louis following his acceptance of needing help with his heroin addiction. When Tess visits the pair after her shift at work, she encourages Charlie to go to bed, and tells him she will keep an eye on Louis until he wakes up. However, when Louis asks Tess to get him a blanket from upstairs, he escapes the house. Cal treats a mother and daughter who were both admitted after a car crash. He helps the mother realise she is being too pushy on her daughter's modelling career when it transpires the mother has put her daughter on a tapeworm diet, unbeknownst to her. Dylan is deeply upset when an elderly patient he is treating dies in bay four of Resus. He convinces himself more could have been done to save his patient. Max and Zoe have an argument about money, so Max sleeps in his car for the night.
953	38	"Heart over Head"	Claire Winyard	Mark Catley and Amber Trentham	4 July 2015	5.04
Dylan learns about the idea of holistic therapy when a patient he is treating suffering abdominal pains uses his holistic therapist to help him cope with the pain. Dylan's patient soon falls more seriously ill and is admitted to Resus, where the holistic therapist demands that his client is not to be placed in bay four, because of a myth about the number four representing death. Dylan is intrigued by this myth, and looks into his recent patient files, where he finds that all the patients who have died recently under his care have all died in bay four. Charlie finds Louis in a drug den, and decides that he will join Louis in his drug-taking antics, prompting Louis to reach out to Charlie and finally accept he needs help.
954	39	"Holby Sin City"	Simon Massey	Mark Catley	11 July 2015	5.13
Ethan finds himself embroiled in a murder investigation when Bonnie, who is married to tattooist Clyde, calls the paramedics after a reported shooting. When Dixie and Iain arrive at the scene they learn Clyde left a suicide note and has tried to kill himself, but then, at the hospital, the gun which Clyde supposedly used to try and kill himself is found in a clinical waste bin. Ethan tries to keep Clyde alive, to Bonnie's dismay, so she pretends the two are in a relationship in hopes that he will be taken off the case. Bonnie later admits that she tried to kill Clyde. Ethan goes to report Bonnie to the police for murder, but by the time he is able to, Bonnie has fled the UK.
955	40	"If You Could Bottle It"	Steve Hughes	Nick Fisher	18 July 2015	5.25
Dylan begins to struggle with his obsessive compulsive behaviour and demands that none of the patients he treats are in bay four in Resus. A bodybuilder storms into the ED with an unconscious casualty on his shoulders. He takes the casualty through to Resus and begins asserting his authority, resulting in a clash with Cal, Charlie, Rita and Tess. He, is Jacob Masters, a new band six nurse. Jacob impresses Connie with his confidence, and when he notices that there is a connection between two patients who both smell of methanol, he discovers that dodgy alcohol is being distributed in Holby. Jacob goes to visit the man responsible for making the alcohol, but as he arrives, the laboratory explodes. Jacob treats the man involved in the explosion for severe burns, and ends his first shift at the ED in the eyes of his colleagues as a hero. Max tells Zoe his mother, Greta, is coming to stay.
956	41	"The Next Step"	Steve Hughes	Julie Dixon	25 July 2015	5.30
Jacob starts his first shift in the ED, and it is not long before he is having to use his powers of persuasion in order to help a schoolgirl whose lies result in her best friend being admitted to the ED in a life-threatening condition because of a lie. Honey makes an unexpected return to Holby, pleasing Noel. Zoe and Max go out for a meal with Greta, but Zoe feels humiliated when Greta learns of the age gap between the couple. Zoe later reveals to Max she cannot have children; Max then proposes to Zoe, and she agrees to marry him. Dylan finds himself becoming increasingly agitated as he continues to avoid bay four in Resus.
957	42	"Dark Horses"	Seán Gleeson	Tony McHale	1 August 2015	5.14
Dylan learns that an incoming patient he is preparing to treat is the fourth person to fall from a building in four days. When his patient arrives at the ED, Dixie and Iain take his patient over to bay four in Resus, so Dylan tampers with the cardiogram in order to avoid having to treat his patient in bay four. Rita learns that Dylan has tampered with medical equipment, and grows concerned about his recent behaviour. She confides in Zoe about her concerns for Dylan, but Dylan overhears and is less than impressed. Lily notices Ethan and Honey getting increasingly close with one another, and so decides to try and keep them apart from each other as much as she can. Tess overhears Zoe and Max discussing their engagement. Not realising they are planning to keep it a secret, Tess tells Robyn. The couple's engagement is soon well-known, and a party is held in the pub for them.
958	43	"The Long Haul"	Seán Gleeson	Steven Fay & Tony Green	8 August 2015	5.35
Dylan is surprised to learn that his father, Brian, and his father's girlfriend, Hazel, have been admitted after they are involved in a lorry crash. There is obvious tension between Dylan and Brian, and when Dylan clashes with Brian again, Brian tells Dylan he is the son he wish he never had. Both Dylan and Brian later receive a shock when Hazel learns she is fifteen weeks pregnant. At the same time, Brian is diagnosed with narcolepsy. Louie steals Tess's crucifix to pay for more drugs. Charlie finds Louie with a deep vein thrombosis and Louie is readmitted to the ED. Tired of trying to help Louis but getting nowhere, Charlie sends Louie away for rehabilitation. Lily realises Ethan is not interested in her, so moves on.
959	44	"Knock Knock Who's There?"	Julie Edwards	Benedict Ayrton & Matthew Barry	15 August 2015	5.37
Tess is surprised by Sam's unexpected return to the ED. She is shocked when he brings his new-born son, Charlie, with him. Sam asks Tess to move up north with him and become more involved in their family. Tess is initially reluctant, but after talking to Charlie and Zoe, ultimately decides she is ready to leave Holby City. Dylan calls Lofty incompetent, forcing Rita to report Dylan's unacceptable behaviour to Connie. When another patient dies under Dylan's care, he walks out the ED while still on shift. Dixie and Iain race against time to save a group of illegal immigrants suffocating inside a crate.
960	45	"Forsaking All Others – Part One"	Jordan Hogg	Asher Pirie	22 August 2015	5.81
Dylan refuses to leave his boathouse after walking out on the ED the previous week. He avoids Zoe, Rita and Connie, as well as his counselling meeting with Ben Harding. Connie voices her concerns about Dylan's fitness to work to Zoe and Rita, leaving Zoe fighting for Dylan's job. Lily discovers she has passed her medical exams and is now a registrar. She tells her parents, but when she realises her father is not as pleased as she had hoped, she desperately seeks approval from Connie. Jacob produces a gunshot policy he would like to implement in the ED, and asks Connie and Rita to read his policy. Connie and Rita soon realise Jacob is manipulating them. Zoe and Max separate as they prepare to celebrate their hen party and stag-do.
961	46	"Forsaking All Others – Part Two"	Julie Edwards	Matthew Barry	23 August 2015	6.44
Zoe and Max's wedding day arrives. Zoe is overwhelmed with guilt after a one-night stand with a stranger she met during her hen party. She contemplates telling Max, but decides to keep her cheating a secret, and marries Max instead. Zoe tells Dylan about her cheating on Max, and when Dylan accidentally reveals Zoe's infidelity at the wedding reception, Zoe flees to Dylan's boathouse and asks him leave shore to get her away from the wedding. Louis is released from rehabilitation and attends the wedding reception. He taunts a drunken Max about Zoe cheating on him, and the pair end up fighting. Whilst fighting, a heater is knocked over and the wedding reception catches fire. Embers from the venue float over to Dylan's boathouse, setting it alight. Dylan soon realises the fire cannot be put out and tells Zoe they need to jump into the water to safety. Zoe jumps, but Dylan realises he has not got his lucky talisman on him. He goes inside the boathouse to retrieve the talisman, but then the boathouse violently explodes.

== Reception ==
The show was awarded the Best Soap and Continuing Drama accolade at the 2015 Royal Television Society award ceremony, beating competitors Coronation Street and EastEnders. Speaking of the win, the Royal Television Society wrote, "[Casualty is] a show that had regained exceptional form. A strong sense of the community within the show never detracted from the individual journeys the characters went on...an excellent drama." In May 2015, it was announced the show had been longlisted for the Best Family Drama award at the 2015 TV Choice Awards. The show made the shortlist but lost out to Call the Midwife. The show won the Best Drama award at the 2015 Inside Soap Awards, beating competitors Holby City and Waterloo Road. The Casualty production team were shortlisted at the BAFTA 2015 awards under the category of Best Television Soap and Continuing Drama, however the show was unsuccessful, with Coronation Street winning instead. Lee Mead was nominated under the category Newcomer for his portrayal of Ben "Lofty" Chiltern at the National Television Awards 2015, however Mead lost out on the award.

Daniel Kilkelly of Digital Spy described the surprise of Jeff's death as a "success". Following the broadcast of the first standalone episode on 15 November 2014, Duncan Lindsay of Metro expressed his opinions on the episode, saying that "the storyline itself wasn't bad at all", however the episode was "let down by the choice of characters involved". Lindsay felt that the lead character of the episode, Lily Chao, was "not a likeable enough character" to lead the murder mystery storyline. Lindsay then went on to say that he felt the episode would have been better if it had focused on the "more personable character" in the show.

Show scriptwriter Mark Catley, who wrote the third standalone episode "Holby Sin City", received negative criticism about the episode from fans, expressing their displeasure at the episode. Daniel Kilkelly of Digital Spy labelled "Holby Sin City" as "one of the show's most divisive episodes ever." The show faced further criticism following the broadcast of episode forty-three, which featured a patient crash his lorry after blacking out while driving. The character was diagnosed with narcolepsy, but refused to tell the DVLA about his diagnosis. The storyline was compared to the real-life 2014 Glasgow bin lorry crash, with four similarities made between the fictional crash and the real-life crash, and described as "deeply unfortunate". A BBC spokesperson said, "We would never knowingly imitate a real life event. Parallels can be drawn with many of our storylines. However, with the amount of stories that we tell of characters in extreme situations, it is hard to avoid dramatising situations that can occasionally be reminiscent of real life events".

Casualty's two-parter finale episodes were described by the Daily Mirror as potentially being "the most dramatic episodes in three decades". After the airing of episode forty-six, Irish Examiner said that fans had been "left reeling" and were "on the edge" following the show's dramatic cliffhanger. Digital Spy stated fans "could not cope" with the episode and had been left with "a lot of feelings following the dramatic cliffhanger".
