= Zoe Hanna =

Fictional character from the BBC medical drama Casualty

- Casualty character
- Sunetra Sarker as Zoe Hanna
- First appearance: "Take a Cup of Kindness"; 29 December 2007
- Last appearance: "Charlie"; 16 March 2024
- Portrayed by: Sunetra Sarker
- Duration: 2007–2016, 2018, 2024
- Spin-off(s): "Mrs Walker-To-Be" (2015)

In-universe information
- Occupation: Consultant in emergency medicine; (prev. clinical lead, trauma lead)
- Spouse: Max Walker (2015–)
- Significant other: Nick Jordan; Matt Strong

Zoe Hanna is a fictional character in BBC's medical drama Casualty, portrayed by Sunetra Sarker. She first appeared in the series twenty-two episode "Take a Cup of Kindness", broadcast on 29 December 2007. The character was a consultant in emergency medicine at Holby City Hospital's emergency department. Sarker chose to take a temporary break from the show in 2014 and Zoe departed from the show in the series 28 episode "A Life Less Lived", broadcast on 23 August 2014. She returned in the series 29 episode "Return to Sender", broadcast on 25 October 2014. Sarker later decided to leave the series indefinitely, but producers asked that she did not announce her departure in order to surprise viewers. After over 8 years on-screen, Zoe departed the series in the series 30 episode "Hello, I Must Be Going", broadcast on 7 May 2016. It was confirmed in September 2017 that Zoe would return for a single episode. She appeared in the nineteenth episode of series 32, broadcast on 13 January 2018. Sarker reprised the role again in 2023 for two episodes linked to Charlie Fairhead's (Derek Thompson) exit; they feature in series 38 and aired on the 9th and 16th of March 2024.

Zoe was described as a "maverick rebel-with-a-cause" and a "good doctor" who "knew what she was talking about" by Sarker. Sarker had portrayed nurses in previous roles who were billed as loveable, sweet girls and preferred playing a feisty character. Zoe enjoys being a doctor and prefers saving lives than working on paperwork, which influenced her decision to step down as clinical lead in 2014. Zoe's personal life is featured frequently in the series and Sarker described Zoe as "kooky" outside of work, but focused upon entering resus.

Zoe's storylines upon her introduction included an affair with married man Sean Anderson (Richard Dillane), being blackmailed for her affair with a fifteen-year-old while unaware of his age and being appointed the emergency department's clinical lead. Zoe later resigned from the post when she began struggling with the demands it involved. In 2008, Zoe became embroiled in helping Abby Evans (Amy Manson), who was being abused and when Abby was killed, Zoe fostered and planned to adopt her daughter Sharice Brooks (Adrianna Bertola). She later began a relationship with her colleague Nick Jordan (Michael French), which dissolved when she lied about being pregnant with his child. They continued a friendship and when Nick refused surgery for a brain tumour, Zoe forged his signature.

A long-running storyline for Zoe was her discovery that she was infertile, something which affected her relationship with Matt Strong (Raymond Coulthard). Zoe developed close friendships with Dylan Keogh (William Beck) and Tess Bateman (Suzanne Packer) during her time in the ED. Zoe was appointed acting clinical lead in 2012, a role which she began permanently in early 2013. She clashed with her deputy Connie Beauchamp (Amanda Mealing) over her management of the emergency department and passed over the role to her in mid-2014. Show producers created a May–December romance for Zoe in early 2014 with porter Max Walker (Jamie Davis). The relationship was well-received by viewers and was labelled "Zax" by fans. They married in 2015 which was followed by an explosive wedding reception that endangered various lives.

== Casting ==
Actress Sunetra Sarker was cast in the role of Zoe Hanna in 2007, joining the show during the twenty-second series. Zoe was introduced as the emergency department's new consultant. Despite being the daughter of a doctor and having portrayed nurses in three of her previous roles, Sarker struggled with the medical jargon and admitted that she learns the terminology phonetically. Sarker said her father was delighted that she was portraying "a good doctor". Sarker added that Zoe's personality attracted her to the role, stating it was a "relief" to play someone feisty as she played "loveable, sweet girls" in her previous roles.

== Development ==
Prior to appearing in Casualty, Sarker had played a guest role in sister show Holby City. Sarker describes Zoe as: "strong, cheeky and rebellious." In 2009, during Zoe's fostering storyline, Sarker commented on her character's feelings, saying: "she felt very guilty about Sharice's mother dying and being partially to blame for it all and I think she's tried to do the right thing.". Sarker then continued, claiming that Zoe was "layered in a lot of selfishness, a lot of righteousness, a lot of pigheadedness". Later on, having given up Sharice, Zoe then embarks on a relationship with department head Nick Jordan. Sarker explained that Zoe and Nick have a very interesting dynamic" and that: "You can see that they're very similar people which would make them allies or enemies. [...] Zoe's the first female to meet Jordan's professional standards. She's no pussycat and Jordan knows that. He's got a certain amount of respect for her, as she has for him. Characterising the relationship, Sarker explained: "They've both been single for a very long time through their own choices and neither of them feel any pressure or expectations, which is a good combination for something to happen. I think this is the grown-up version of a flirtation. It's a bit more factual with these two; there isn't much softness or gooeyness to them. They are more like steel on steel!"

In 2014, series producer Erika Hossington spoke to Digital Spy about future plans for Zoe, saying that one of three standalone episodes aired by the series would be centred around Zoe, "The second standalone is an episode for Zoe, which has been written by Barbara Machin. It's a 'What if?'-themed episode." Hossington also spoke about Zoe's relationship with Max, saying that it was the light relief she needed whilst clinical lead, but when the audience began engaging into their relationship, they became pleased with the fanbase. She continued to state they are "great" together as well as comparing them to Moonlighting's Cybill Shepherd and Bruce Willis. Hossington also revealed that following their rivalry, Connie and Zoe would call a truce.

=== Relationship with Dylan Keogh ===
In 2012, after the characters of Sam Nicholls (Charlotte Salt) and Dylan Keogh (William Beck) were revealed to be married, Casualty producer Nikki Wilson teased Zoe's relationship to Inside Soap with Dylan saying, "The relationship between Dylan and Zoe is very interesting, because when we first mentioned the obvious chemistry between the pair to the actors who play them [Beck and Sarker], they genuinely had no idea! So in one way it's great that they're not playing it in that way. But we really enjoy their banter, and there's definitely a lot more stuff to happen between them. Whether they'll get together remains to be seen...."

=== Break (2014) ===
Series producer Erika Hossington revealed in an interview with Digital Spy that Sarker had temporarily departed the show and that Zoe's exit scenes would air on 23 August, "That was because Sunetra Sarker, who has been fantastically faithful to Casualty over the last few years, just wanted to have a bit of time out. That gave us an opportunity to come up with a new story for the character."

=== Departure and returns ===
Sarker chose to leave the role in May 2016 after eight and a half years and on 7 May 2016, Zoe's exit aired as she chose to leave Holby and Max behind and join Nick in Michigan. Sarker's exit had not been announced prior to transmission, surprising viewers. Sarker had appeared in the series for nearly eight and a half years at the time of her departure. She described her time on the show as "a privilege and a pleasure", before thanking cast, crew and the "wonderful fans". Kent commented that he "missed" Sarker on-set. Hossington said Zoe's departure was "like losing a member of your family" and "it really, really hits [the team] and we get very emotional about it." She added that Sarker continuing to appear in the series after eight years was "a huge commitment" and "a testament to how special the show is and how passionate [she is] about it".

Producer Lucy Raffety confirmed in September 2017 that Sarker had reprised her role as Zoe and the character would return for one episode in early 2018. Zoe's return is billed as "sensational". Sarker revealed that, following her decision to leave the show, Jamie Davis who plays Max asked her to promise she would return when he decided to depart, a promise she honoured by appearing in the episode broadcast on 13 January 2018.

In September 2023, Sarker announced during an appearance of daytime talkshow Loose Women that she had returned to filming Casualty. She revealed that Zoe would feature in a double episode linked with the departure of Charlie Fairhead (Derek Thompson), the show's longest-serving character. The episodes will air in 2024 and feature in the thirty-eighth series. Sarker was excited to reprise the role and explained that she wanted her "last little moment" with Charlie.

== Storylines ==
Zoe joins the emergency department after being appointed by Harry Harper (Simon MacCorkindale) as a new consultant. Not long after her arrival, Zoe had an affair with Orthopedic Consultant Sean Anderson (Richard Dillane), unaware he is the husband of her colleague and friend, staff nurse Jessica Harrison (Gillian Kearney). In series 22 episode 29, Zoe goes head to head with Maggie Coldwell (Susan Cookson) for Harry's position, following his departure and successfully wins the post. When Maggie later appears at a tribunal for negligence, the hospital manager Marilyn Fox (Caroline Langrishe) asks Zoe to lie in court, condemning Maggie. Marilyn blackmails Zoe, threatening to reveal her affair with Sean to Jessica. Zoe disregards her threat, clears Maggie's name and admits her affair to everyone. Zoe then bids farewell to Maggie, who has decided to leave Holby to travel abroad.

Zoe is left upset when she discovers she cannot naturally conceive. Zoe later becomes close to Abby Evans (Amy Manson), a patient she has treated who is being abused by her husband and his father. After Abby manages to escape from them with her daughter, Sharice (Adrianna Bertola), Zoe lets them stay with her. Abby is extremely kind to Zoe and thankfully that she let them stay. When Abby and her husband are both killed in a fight, Zoe takes in Sharice permanently and begins fostering her. She begins taking steps to adopting Sharice, however, once Zoe realizes that she is struggling to balance her career and Sharice, she allows her to live with Abby's parents.

Zoe later begins a relationship with Nick Jordan (Michael French), which Nick ends when he leaves the ED at the end of series 23. At the beginning of series 24, Nick's clinical lead replacement, Adam Trueman (Tristan Gemmill), assigns Zoe three of the new junior doctors – May Phelps (Laura Aikman), Lenny Lyons (Steven Miller) and Yuki Reid (Will Sharpe) – to her to show them the ropes of the ED and Zoe reassigns May to Ruth Winters (Georgia Taylor) and Yuki to Jeff Collier and Polly Emmerson (Matt Bardock and Sophia Di Martino), while she keeps Lenny under her wing. Zoe later discovers that Nick left because he has a brain tumor and wanted to die alone. Zoe then lies to save his life against his will by forging his signature on documents allowing him treatment. Much remains unsaid in the relationship as he originally didn't appreciate the actions she made. As time goes on, Nick begins to assume she signed the papers saving his life because Zoe is pregnant, prompting her to begin failed cycles of fertility treatments. Nick never realized that she was not pregnant, but after she tells him that she isn't pregnant, Nick ends the relationship again. Nick and Zoe, however, continue to be great friends and close colleagues.

Zoe then begins a relationship with Joel (Max Deacon), unaware he is only fifteen and still in school. She discovers this and Joel steals her memory stick containing her work on, to ensure that Zoe would see him again. Zoe tracks him to a school trip to the zoo he is on with Nick and he attempts to swallow it causing him to be brought into the ED as a patient. In series twenty-five, Zoe is shown to have developed a friendship new staff nurse, Mads Durrani (Hasina Haque) and encouraged her to get more involved with the team outside of the ED, like going to the pub – despite her religion. A new consultant, Dylan Keogh (William Beck), arrives in the ED and makes quite an impression on Zoe and the rest of the team, but after spotting his light side, Zoe begins to warm to him. This is later seen again when Zoe discovers that Dylan helps out paramedics, Jeff and Dixie Dixon (Jane Hazlegrove) voluntarily. In series 26 episode 6, Zoe receives an unexpected promotion from Nick. Her relationship with Dylan hits the rocks when she discovers he has a past with new doctor, Sam Nicholls (Charlotte Salt), but Dylan and Sam deny this. Zoe and Dylan are left trapped in resus when the hospital is set alight by a huge fire. They are saved by fire crew and both make a full recovery, but the relationship is once again left hit when it is revealed that Sam and Dylan are married.

While on a night out with staff nurse, Linda Andrews (Christine Tremarco), Zoe discovers a desperate teenage in need of some serious medical attention, causing their night to be cut short. Zoe later helps Linda again when she tries making her niece, Britney (Devon Beigan) see that living with Linda, while her mother, Denise Andrews (Kate McEvoy) is imprisoned, won't be bad. Sam is later delivered some bad news by Zoe as she tells Sam that she has been called to testify against her in her upcoming court case, but when the court day arrives, Zoe tells the court some serious information that changes everything. Zoe later helps Sam when she realizes that Sam actually wants to divorce Dylan and Zoe persuades her to send the papers to Dylan.

When Nick's girlfriend, DCI Yvonne Rippon (Rachel Shelley) was stabbed during the Holby Riots, Nick took extended leave to look after her and Director of Surgery, Henrik Hanssen (Guy Henry) promoted Zoe to acting clinical lead. Zoe is left disappointed when Dylan decides to leave Holby after realizing that he hasn't got over Sam and never will. Zoe continues her role as acting clinical lead for nineteen weeks, until Nick returns to work. Zoe then begins to worry about Nick's mental stability as he becomes more and more determined to save Yvonne from dying. Zoe and ITU consultant, Dr Earl advises Nick to turn off Yvonne's life support machine, but he refuses. However, when Nick helps treat a patient who wants to end her life suffering, it makes him see sense and with Zoe's help, he turns off her machine. Nick decides to return to work full-time, but after treating the person who is believed to be Yvonne's murderer and then treating the real murderer, Nick decides he is going to leave Holby to work with Anton Meyer in Michigan. He hands Zoe his keys and she is then promoted to clinical lead. When Martin Ashford (Patrick Robinson) returns to the department, he makes a bad impression on Zoe and when she gets the flu, she becomes reluctant to leave him in charge. She is impressed, however, when she returns the following week and finds the ED running well. She becomes stuck between 'a rock and a hard place' when junior doctor, Lily Chao (Crystal Yu) makes a complaint against Ash and makes matters worse when trying to persuade Lily to not complain. Zoe is later seen helping Ash realize that his daughter, Ella Ashford (Tahirah Sharif) isn't the good girl he believes.

Zoe also began a close friendship with senior nurse, Tess Bateman (Suzanne Packer), after assisting her through an abortion she had while in an affair with fellow nurse, Adrian Fletcher (Alex Walkinshaw). At that point, Zoe is the only other people that know who Fletch had an affair with aside from Fletch and Tess, themselves. Zoe later begins to panic when Tess tells her that she is planning on resigning so that she doesn't have to face Fletch again, but fortunately, Zoe manages to show her that she loves Holby City Hospital and everyone would miss her if she were to leave. Robyn Miller (Amanda Henderson)'s stepbrother and the new porter, Max Walker (Jamie Davis) later takes a shine to Zoe as she spends a day seeing what is like to be a porter. They later sleep together and begin a secret relationship. It is later shown that Zoe is struggling to manage running the ED, going to meetings with the head office staff and treat patients. This doesn't go unnoticed by the staff, but most of them brush it off. Zoe also becomes impressed with new registrars; Ethan Hardy (George Rainsford) and Caleb Knight (Richard Winsor) and nurse; Lofty Chiltern (Lee Mead)'s work and agrees for them all to stay on a permanent role. Zoe is next seen trying to save Dixie's girlfriend, Carol Walcott (Georgia MacKenzie) from dying of a head injury she failed to alert anyone off. Zoe is the one that is left to tell Dixie that Carol has died.

Zoe later helps a veteran tell her daughter that she was in fact adopted. Zoe and staff nurse, Rita Freeman (Chloe Howman) treat a prisoner, who hopes that if he ends up in the ED, he may be able to see his mother. It later turns out he has a serious condition and mother and son are eventually reunited. Zoe begins to pester the hospital's new CEO, Guy Self (John Michie) for a new consultant as they have still been in need of a replacement for Dylan. They later plan to draw up a shortlist but, in the week leading up to this Guy hires the hospital's former cardiothoracic surgeon, Connie Beauchamp (Amanda Mealing), who has retrained as an emergency department consultant. Zoe is unaware of this and immediately clashes with her upon her arrival and becomes infuriated when she discovers that she will be sharing an office with Connie. Zoe, Connie and Lily later join to help a father and his daughter, who has ADHD after the father is impaled with a metal stick and the daughter disappears. However, it isn't long until Zoe is arguing again with Connie over how the ED should be run. Zoe later works with staff nurse Robyn Miller (Amanda Henderson) after an elderly women arrives in the ED after sniffing cocaine. Connie later annoys both Zoe and Ash when she starts playing games with each of them, pretending to agree with both of them. However, they both discover what Connie has been doing and confront her.

Zoe is made very annoyed by Connie, when she voices her opinions over the ED to Guy. Weeks later, a horrific helicopter accident involving a family results in Zoe attending the scene of the accident. After the area is deemed unsafe, Zoe is left trapped in the helicopter with one of the patients. When both are rescued, Zoe's patient dies when Zoe defends the ED to the press and media, who are present due to the events that occurred last week, involving an increase of patients arriving at the ED. Zoe then realises that the role of clinical lead is not something she enjoys, as it involves constant meetings and paperwork and therefore less time with patients, which is what she wants to do. As a result, in the aftermath of the death of her patient, she steps down from the role of clinical lead. The role of clinical lead is given to Connie, which leaves her delighted. Guy questions Zoe's future in the department, to which Connie tells Guy that when she is working as a consultant, Zoe is one of the best she's ever worked with. She goes on to say that Zoe will always have her full support and tells Guy not to question her decision for Zoe to remain in the department. The following week, it is made clear that Tess and Fletch had an affair to everybody, including Fletch's wife Natalie, meaning that Zoe is no longer the only person that is aware of their affair. Fletch then decides to leave his position. Tess returns to work, following time off, and seems very off with Zoe. causing Zoe confusion.

Despite her resignation, Zoe still shares an office with Connie, implying she is now just a Consultant and Deputy Clinical Lead. Also since her resignation, Zoe has spent more time with Max in their secret relationship. Zoe, along with Connie, Ash, Tess and Robyn are all present when Rita reveals that her husband is not deceased, as she had previously told everyone, but imprisoned for child assault. Connie, with Zoe and Tess present, begins to shout at Rita over her lies, but Zoe steps in and tells Connie that Rita is one of Tess' nurses so it isn't her place to tell Rita off – it is Tess'.

In August 2014, Zoe and Rita help treat a patient, Molly, who is faking her symptoms, however, Zoe fails to notice the reasons why. She then embarrasses herself by telling Ash that her staff are 'cowardly, back-stabbing and spineless' without realising they are standing behind her as a birthday surprise. Tess then finds her and lets Zoe see the truth about Molly. Molly then tells Zoe that a life less lived is no life at all, and Zoe realises that she works too much and resigns from the ED after Connie suggested that she took a 4-week holiday.. Zoe then ends her relationship with Max the way it started, with a kiss outside the pub, and Max declares his love for Zoe. Two months later, Zoe sends a hamper to boost staff morale in the aftermath of Jeff's death. At the end of the episode, Connie is seen to get in contact with Zoe.

Zoe returns and is seen with Dylan in the kitchen of his boat house. She then returns to working in the ED with Dylan the following week. When Connie is arrested, after a set-up by Rita Freeman, Zoe acts briefly as Clinical Lead, though she is seen again to be unhappy in the role, with the paperwork and bureaucracy the role involves. She later transfers the role to Dylan. In August 2015, Zoe and Max's wedding is ruined, after Zoe reveals she cheated on him at her hen night and their wedding marquee catches fire after an altercation between her Newly wed Husband and Louis. Zoe, unaware of the fire and unable to face Max, visits Dylan on his boat. Distraught and claiming that Max now hates her after she told him everything. Embers from the marquee fly towards the boat which later catches fire also. Dylan tries to put it out with a fire extinguisher he requests for Zoe to bring up to him but a gas canister is soon alight and it explodes. After trying to ring Max and having no luck. She jumps into the icy water for safety as the fire threatens to take hold of the boat, just as Dylan rushes back into the boat, but she can't fight the cold water. Charlie later saves her life by dragging her back to shore with the help of a distraught Max. Zoe suffers a severe case of hypothermia, but is released from hospital soon afterwards. Even though Zoe and Max share a kiss after the accident, Max is still angry with his new wife. Max later asks for a divorce from Zoe, but they later become more civilised with each other.

Zoe later leaves Holby for a job in Michigan with Jordan, leaving Max broken hearted. Months later, Zoe returns to Holby and asks Max to take her back. Max initially refuses, but surprises Zoe by joining her on her flight to Spain.

== Reception ==
For her portrayal of Zoe, Sarker was longlisted in the "Outstanding Drama Performance (Female)" category at the 18th National Television Awards in 2013. At the 19th ceremony in 2014, she was longlisted in the Drama Performance category. Following her exit from Casualty, Sarker was nominated for Best Drama Star at the 2016 Inside Soap Awards.

A reporter of The Telegraph included Zoe in the ten best characters of Casualty. They wrote, "The ambitious but chaotic senior consultant lived her life on coffee and cigarettes." They expressed disappointment with her exit, noting that she left "with little fanfare". In a feature listing "best doctors Casualty has ever seen", critic Emma Bullimore from the Radio Times placed Zoe at number one and dubbed her the "Queen of the ED". She liked her characterisation, particularly how she was not without fault. She named the character's friendship with Dylan, and relationships with Nick and Max as highlights to her time in the serial. In another feature rating relationships in the show, Bullimore ranked Zoe and Max's relationship third, and observed that their "chemistry was off the charts". Digital Spy's Sophie Dainty called Zoe a "fun, kind and chaotic doctor" and expressed a wish for Sarker to reprise the role. She commented, "there has been a massive Zoe-shaped hole in the ED ever since she departed." Hossington described Zoe as "loved and iconic".
