= Lofty Chiltern =

Fictional character from the BBC medical dramas Casualty and Holby City

- Casualty and Holby City character
- Lee Mead as Lofty Chiltern
- First appearance: "The Last Chance Saloon"; 1 March 2014 (Casualty) "Project Aurous"; 16 May 2017 (Holby City)
- Last appearance: "High Tide"; 12 March 2016 (Casualty) "Lemons"; 17 December 2019 (Holby City)
- Portrayed by: Lee Mead
- Spinoff(s): "Mrs Walker-To-Be" (2015)

In-universe information
- Occupation: Staff nurse, Discharge co-ordinator; (prev. Senior staff nurse)
- Spouse: Dominic Copeland (2018−)
- Relatives: Shelaigh Chiltern (grandmother)

Ben "Lofty" Chiltern is a fictional character from the BBC medical dramas Casualty and Holby City, played by actor Lee Mead. He first appeared in Casualty's twenty-eighth series episode "The Last Chance Saloon", broadcast on 1 March 2014. The character is introduced to fill the role of a young, male nurse. Mead previously appeared in the drama in the twenty-sixth series of Casualty. Lofty originally appears as a staff nurse but is promoted to senior staff nurse in 2016. The character is specifically written for Mead and he was contracted to the show for a year. Lofty is portrayed as a nice person who is likeable and popular. His clumsiness often leaves him in awkward situations although he is a brilliant nurse and a team player. Lofty's backstory states that when his parents grew tired of his wild behaviour, they kicked him out.

The character's introduction sees him found to be living in Robyn Miller (Amanda Henderson) and Max Walker's (Jamie Davis) loft. In Casualty, Lofty develops friendships with Robyn, Max and Dylan Keogh (William Beck). Mead took a sabbatical from the show in 2015 and Lofty departs after feeling responsible for the death of an agency nurse. The character departed in the series thirty episode "High Tide", broadcast on 12 March 2016. Eighteen months later, Mead decided to reprise the role in Holby City. Lofty first appears in the series nineteen episode "Project Aurous", broadcast on 16 May 2017, when he joins the fictional Keller ward as a staff nurse. Producers explored Lofty's absence and his ability to work in the hospital, as well as establishing friendships with his new colleagues.

Through his absence, Lofty's sexuality is explored and he is revealed to be bisexual. After initially clashing, Lofty develops a friendship and on-off relationship with Dominic "Dom" Copeland (David Ames). They later marry and face problems in their marriage. Mead also appears in one episode of Casualty in June 2017. The character and Mead's portrayal are well received from critics, with Lofty's relationships with Dylan and Dom gaining a positive response. For his portrayal, Mead has been nominated for two Newcomer awards at the 2014 TV Times Awards and the 20th National Television Awards respectively.

== Casting ==
The character of Lofty was written with Mead in mind. Producers created the role after Daniel Anthony's decision to quit his role as nurse, Jamie Collier. They realised the show would be lacking a young, male nurse and decided to cast Mead. Mead explained that they were looking for a nurse who "had a big heart and cares for his patients with a unique insight". Show writer Matthew Barry said that having Mead in mind helped the writing team write for Lofty. The show's executive producer Oliver Kent asked Mead's agent if Mead would read for the role and when his agent told him the news, Mead believed he was "joking". At the audition, Mead read for the show's producer and casting directors. He believed that he had delivered what they wanted, but was not sure he was "in the frame" for the character. He was originally signed to the serial for a year and expressed a possibility in renewing his contract.

Mead originally auditioned for the role of Kieron Fletcher in 2010, but was told he did not have enough acting experience. He later made an appearance on the show as patient Harry Timms in the series twenty-six episode "Starting Out". Mead enjoyed the appearance and described Lofty as "a completely different challenge" in comparison. After his guest appearance on the show, he received a handwritten letter from Kent, who said that he would remember his performance for any future roles. Mead felt honoured to be invited back to the show. In the guest appearance, Mead filmed scenes with Jane Hazlegrove, who plays paramedic Kathleen "Dixie" Dixon, and expressed his delight to filming again with Hazlegrove.

Due to the on-set team of professional medical staff, Mead did not require any medical training for the role. Nurses would regularly help him with medical terminology and procedures to add realism to the scenes. He added that he found learning the terminology enjoyable and formed an interest in the show's prosthetic department. He described the show's twelve hours a day routine as "very intense". Casualty is Mead's first regular television role after ten years in musical theatre and he described it as "a new phase" in his career. Mead struggled to make the transition from musical theatre to television and said it was "a whole new career" for him. In addition to his work in musical theatre, Mead is a singer and producers allowed him to perform in concerts while contracted to the show.

The character and Mead's casting were publicised on 19 September 2013. On his casting, Mead said, "I'm thrilled to be joining Casualty. I am hoping [Lofty] will charm audiences and they will get behind him. I can't wait to get started and to learn all of the medical jargon!" Kent said, "As the character Lofty was being developed, we couldn't think of anyone else to better to play him. We can't wait to start filming and are thrilled to have Lee join the team. With a very different background to most of the other nurses, his clumsy charm is sure to win everyone over." Mead expressed his delight at joining the show in several media interviews and in a BBC Online interview, he described it is as an "honour".

At the time of filming five episodes for the show, Mead expressed his content at being involved in the show. In June 2015, Mead reflected on his casting and expressed his gratitude for Kent for creating the role as it had "brought more variety into [his] working life". He added that he the show had provided him with a "fantastic" experience.

== Development ==
=== Characterisation ===
Always stumbling around, he somehow managed to stumble into a job at Holby where he brightens up the corridors with his big blue eyes and beaming smile. Although he is not the smoothest of talkers, or walkers, his warmth and kindness make him easy to forgive. He’s fond of daydreaming, but his clumsiness and lack of attention can often land him in scrapes.

— BBC Online.

Lofty is billed as a "likeable and popular nurse with a less-than-ordinary background". He is a good person who is cheerful and happy. Lofty is in his early thirties. Despite partying heavily, Lofty is a decent man with good intentions. Lofty is fun and has a positive outlook, which Mead thought made him "a very interesting character." Lofty can be clumsy and Mead explained that Lofty is prone to saying the "wrong thing" and falling over. Mead found that Lofty is normally "in his own little world", which leads to the "awkward situations" he finds himself in. Mead summarised the character as "decent but lazy." Reza Moradi, the director of Lofty's first episode, described the character as "a sweet nature guy who has had a temporary bit of bad luck". Reporters writing for Inside Soap called the character a "hunky nurse", "adorable", a "hapless medic" and a "beloved colleague". Holly Wade of Radio Times described Lofty as friendly and attractive but also "a bit oblivious and bumbling".

Lofty's energy creates a nice working environment; a contributor to BBC Online said that the ED are fortunate to employ such a positive person, who has "energy and spark". The character is naïve and a team player who contributes morale and liveliness. Lofty is a fantastic nurse and excels in helping children. Executive producer Kent described Lofty as "the most adorable character" and compared him to nurse John "Abs" Denham (James Redmond), who was well-received during his tenure on the show. Barry, who wrote Lofty's introduction, thought Lofty resembled a younger, less posh Hugh Grant and described the character as "a bumbly, lovely, nice chap." Elaine Reilly of What's on TV called Lofty a "mild-mannered medic" and a "loveable nurse". Other critics have described the character as "kind", "amiable" and "genuine".

"He is exactly the kind of nurse you want at your bedside, funny, kind and gentle, but most of all great at what he does. A nice guy to the core, Lofty is the kind of person everyone would count themselves lucky to have as a friend."

— A BBC Online contributor on Lofty in Holby City. (2018)

Lofty retains similar characteristics when he joins Casualty's spin-off series, Holby City. He is described as enjoyable and uncoordinated, while Mead calls Lofty a "happy-go-lucky" character. Mead believed that Lofty is enjoyable because he is a different and unconventional, which appears sweet to an audience. During his on-screen absence, Lofty develops a new-found confidence. Mead said that he returns "a new man". He also stated that another angle to Lofty's personality would be displayed in Holby City. Mead told a reporter from What's On TV that Lofty understands "what he wants from life". Despite Lofty's newly-developed confidence, Mead insisted that he has maintained his personality traits. Mead thought that Lofty had an unconventional method of treating patients and opined that he resembles fictional detective Sherlock Holmes. A BBC Online reporter found Lofty's clumsiness to be sweet rather than a flaw in his characterisation. They also stated that Lofty is not sophisticated, although this can be forgotten because he is warm and friendly. Lofty also does not believe in karma because he has witnessed "too many bad things happen to good people."

=== Backstory and introduction ===
Lofty is a trained nurse who was living with his parents and using their money to party. Lofty repeatedly told his parents that he would apply for a job and find somewhere to live, which he never did. His parents grew tired of him and his father asked him to move out so Lofty lied and told them he had found a house. In May 2017, Mead revealed that Lofty's backstory would be explored, specifically the character's reasons for joining the nursing profession.

Lofty's first episode, entitled "The Last Chance Saloon", aired on 1 March 2014. In Lofty's first scenes, it emerges that he is living in the loft of a house owned by his father and rented by Robyn Miller (Amanda Henderson) and Max Walker (Jamie Davis), having stolen the keys to the house. The scenes provided the character with the nickname, "Lofty". Robyn found him in the house, topless and about to iron a shirt. Henderson explained that Robyn is scared and angry to find Lofty. Robyn chases him and so, Lofty — still topless — is "forced to make a run for it" by leaping over fences in the rain. Moradi believed that the chase sequence was something that Barry "had in mind when going over quite a lot of things", but struggled with due to the location's practicality. The chase sequence was the first scenes Mead filmed, which he found surreal.

In the chase, Robyn is injured after stepping on a rake and Lofty had to decide to either "leave her and run, or do the right thing"; Lofty chooses to help Robyn and Barry explained that it is in Lofty's nature to stay and help Robyn. Mead said Lofty stays because he is "a good guy". Because he helps Robyn, Lofty misses an interview at a local hospital. After discovering this, Robyn speaks to management about Lofty and he is offered a vacant nursing position at the hospital. Mead explained that Robyn is able to see that Lofty is a good person and so, as well as helping him receive a job, she offers him a place to live. Mead praised the character's introduction, expressing his enjoyment at filming it. In an interview with BBC Online, Mead revealed filming took place over a twelve hour day and summarised the day as having to "literally [roll] in mud." Henderson added that filming was interrupted by bad weather. Moradi praised Mead's approach to filming in his introduction, praising his professionalism; she said that Mead was "really cool" with the cast and crew on-set.

=== Friendships ===
Lofty's friendly personality helps him form friendships with people. Barry thought that Lofty would fit in effortlessly with his colleagues because he is so easy-going. The writer expected Lofty to have good relations with Robyn, Max, and Noel Garcia (Tony Marshall). Lofty shares a close relationship with Robyn and likewise, Mead shares a good friendship with Henderson. They share many scenes and Barry compared their relationship to a relationship shared between siblings. In early 2015, Robyn developed feelings for Lofty and tries to form a relationship with him. Reflecting on Robyn's feelings, Henderson said "She was so in love with him, but he just didn't feel the same."

"Lofty is going to struggle, partly because he wants to please Dylan, who pushes him a bit further out of his comfort zone than he should go. The results are pretty disastrous for Lofty, but his completely fabulous bromance with Dylan is ongoing."

— Oliver Kent on Lofty's friendship with Dylan Keogh. (2016)

Producers established a friendship between Lofty and consultant Dylan Keogh (William Beck). Mead enjoyed filming with Beck because they got on well. He said that the difference between Lofty's "awkwardness and sincerity" and Dylan's "very dry and direct" approach made "a good contrast". Mead revealed that he and Beck often kept corpsing in takes. In November 2015, Hossington teased the show's Christmas episode and revealed that Lofty and Dylan would feature heavily in it. She commented, "there's the most fantastic ending with Dylan and Lofty that people will be talking about for a very long time!" Hossington also expressed her enjoyment at Lofty's relationship with Dylan and described them as "the odd couple" with a "fun bromance". Mead liked the pairing of Lofty and Dylan, calling their friendship "strange but also quite special". The actor hoped that Lofty's friendship with Dylan would still develop following his move to Holby City. He told Brown (Radio Times) that the characters formed a "funny bond" and found them a strange pairing that developed over time.

In Holby City, Lofty has a good relationship with his superior, Sacha Levy (Bob Barrett), as they share similar personalities and Sacha understands that Lofty is trying his best. Mead enjoyed working with Barrett and said it is fun to watch their friendship develop. Lofty also forms friendships with his colleagues on Keller ward, including Essie Harrison (Kaye Wragg) and Raf di Lucca (Joe McFadden), with Mead suggesting the potential for Lofty to develop friendships outside the ward. Producers planned to create more connections for Lofty when they figured out who he works well with.

=== Other storylines ===
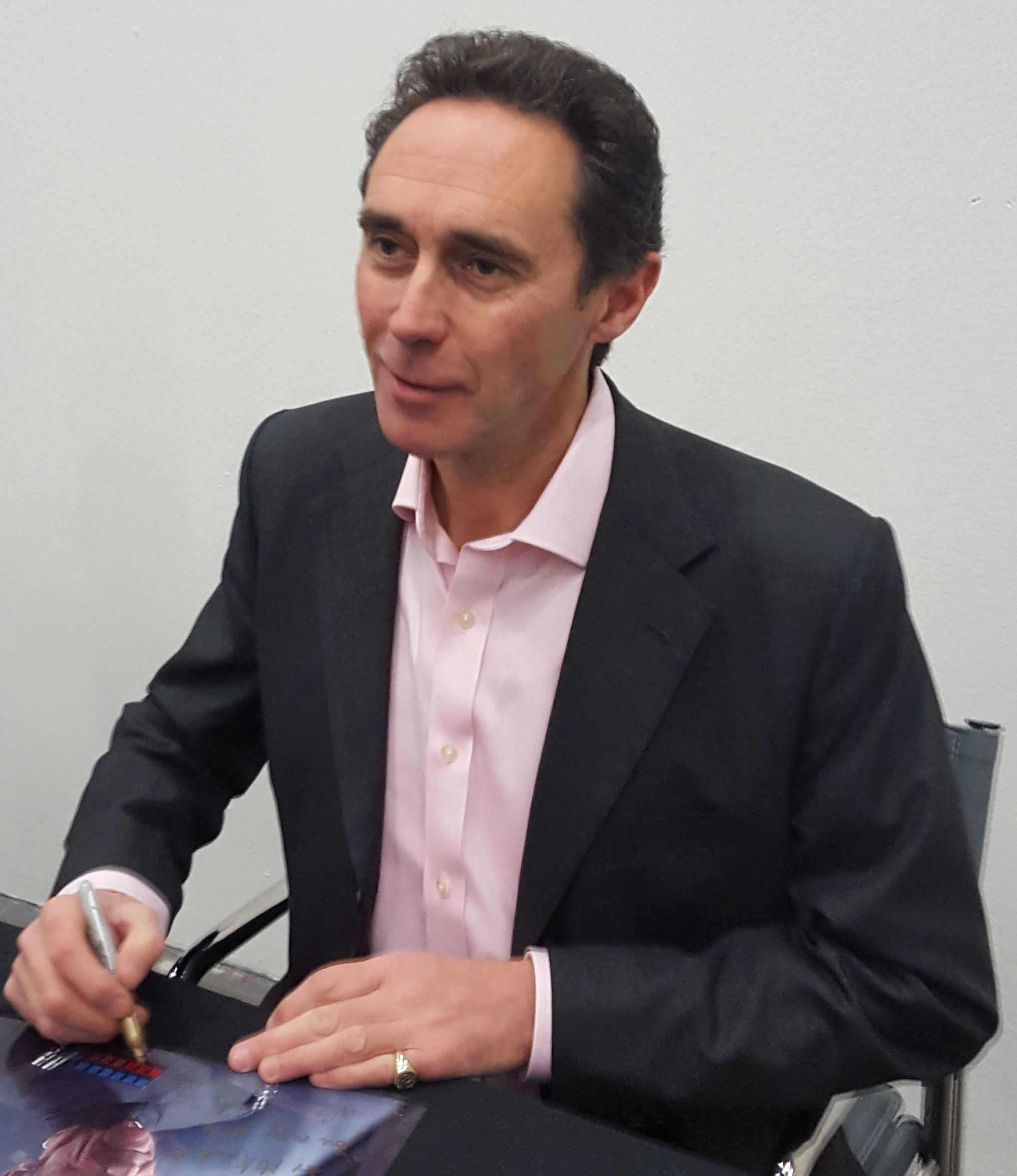
Henrik Hanssen (Guy Henry, pictured) interviews Lofty for the senior staff nurse position.

At the time of his introduction, Mead promised "some good storylines" for Lofty. In an early storyline, paramedic Kathleen "Dixie" Dixon (Jane Hazlegrove) asks Lofty to help reunite a patient with his estranged, terminally ill mother before she dies. Lofty agrees to help Dixie and they hire a campervan and take the mother and son to the seaside. Mead explained that the characters are "doing a good deed". He added that the son's reunion with his mother is "uplifting" because they have a damaged relationship. Mead said he enjoyed filming the episode, but ultimately described the episode as "quite a sad episode". Lofty is punished for his actions; Mead revealed he would be "demoted for a while and sent to another part of the hospital".

In January 2016, a vacancy for a senior staff nurse becomes available and Dylan pushes Lofty to apply. Prior to the interview, Lofty is "a bag of nerves", which are made worse when he arrives and discovers that the hospital's CEO, Henrik Hanssen (Guy Henry), would be interviewing him. As Lofty settles, clinical lead Connie Beauchamp (Amanda Mealing) forces him to return to work as the ED is over-capacity. Despite believing he has ruined his chances, Lofty is offered the promotion.

In November 2017, Lofty learns that Morven Digby (Eleanor Fanyinka) is estranged from her mother, Evelyn Chapman (Imogen Stubbs). When Evelyn is admitted into the hospital with stomach pains, Lofty starts treating her. However, he is forced to reveal Evelyn's identity to Morven when she tries treating her. Morven is "furious" with Lofty's deceit.

=== Departure ===
In late 2015, producer Hossington teased a new storyline for the character, which would not "disappoint" fans. She added that Dylan would feature heavily in the storyline with Lofty. The storyline begins in February 2016 when Lofty is challenged to run the ED in the absence of senior nurses Charlie Fairhead (Derek Thompson) and Rita Freeman (Chloe Howman). Despite Jacob Masters (Charles Venn) planning to run the ED, Dylan volunteers Lofty for the job, which he reluctantly accepts after encouragement from Dylan. Mead explained that as a senior staff nurse, Lofty has been waiting for such an opportunity. Lofty panics when he has to deal with "football hooligans and AWOL patients", but regains control and runs the department successfully. Lofty hires agency nurse Diane Stuart (Catherine Skinner) to help with the ED's workload; an Inside Soap reporter described Diane as "incompetent".

"Diane was half asleep at the time and not really on the ball, so Lofty wasn't actually in the wrong. But the fact is that the incident happened on Lofty's watch, and he can't deal with the guilt of that. [...] The bigger dilemma for him is whether he can cope with the fact this person that was in his care has died."

— Lee Mead on Lofty's guilt following Diane's death. (2016)

Diane struggles from sleep loss and when Lofty catches her taking pills to keep her awake, he asks to discuss it with her in his office. Diane reveals her husband recently left her and her teenage daughter so Lofty offers her a second chance. Lofty, Diane and Dylan later become stuck in a lift and have to resuscitate a patient. When she fails to remove her hand from the patient in time, Diane electrocutes herself and dies. Mead promised that Diane's death would create drama for Lofty. He revealed that he became emotional when he watched the episode. In the aftermath of Diane's death, Lofty begins to blame himself for her death and prepares to be interviewed by the hospital's board, who decide whether Lofty can keep his job. Dylan is "adamant" that neither of them were to blame and encourages Lofty to be "firm" with the board, but when Lofty meets Diane's mother, he questions whether he is to blame. Mead explained that Lofty struggles to cope with Diane's death because he "saw so much of himself in her".

The board allow Lofty to continue working, but he decides to resign regardless due to his feelings surrounding Diane's death. Lofty explains that he is struggling with Diane's death. Mead explained that Diane's death is "a huge thing" for Lofty because it happened on his first shift as nursing lead. Mead also explained that Lofty needs "distance and time" to understand the events surrounding Diane's death and to decide whether he can return to the hospital and "confront those demons within himself". Reflecting on his character's reasons for leaving, Mead said that Lofty is "quite ashamed and embarrassed to face his colleagues". He told Tricia Martin of Total TV Guide that Lofty is scarred by the events and compared it to a marriage breakdown, commenting that "it's always there, but you have move forward — life goes on." He observed that Diane's death leaves the character "traumatised". Lofty decides to take a break from his job and travel Australia and New Zealand while retraining as a bereavement counsellor. Mead explained that Lofty feels disappointed in himself and decides that he needs to move "as far away as possible". When the actor watched the episode, he became emotional and felt proud of the storyline, hoping viewers would sympathise with Lofty.

Off-screen, Mead took a one-year hiatus from the show in order to spend more time with his daughter and explore new roles. Mead chose to leave the show because he got "itchy feet" and wanted to return to theatre. Producers tried to persuade Mead to remain with the show and offered to extend his contract by a further two years, but he wanted to spend more time with his daughter as she grew older. Describing his experience on Casualty, Mead said it had been "amazing". Mead reassured fans of the show that he could reprise the role since Lofty still had a job at the hospital. He promised that he would return to the drama. Despite this, Mead told Elaine Reilly of What's on TV that his return had not been confirmed and there was a possibility he may not reprise the role. Mead's official website described his break as "a 12-month leave of absence". In September 2016, Mead expressed his interest in reprising the role. He reflected on the role in May 2017, commenting that he missed the show as he created "strong bonds" on the show.

=== Holby City introduction ===
"I'm really excited to be coming back as Lofty, I've missed him! I'm looking forward to being in a new part of the Holby hospital and seeing what it has in store for him next."

— Lee Mead on Lofty's reintroduction. (2017)

In September 2016, Kent asked Mead to reprise the role of Lofty in Casualty's spin-off show, Holby City. The actor initially believed Kent was asking him to reprise the role in Casualty so declined, but when Kent explained the situation, he accepted. Holby City is filmed at BBC Elstree Centre, which is a 45-minute journey from Mead's home and benefits him as he can continue to assist with the care of his daughter. Mead believed that he would never reprise the role, but felt that Lofty could be further explored so he was pleased to receive the call. Mead was initially signed up for a three month trial to explore whether the character works well with other characters. His contract was later extended to September 2017, with the potential to extend the contract beyond that. Mead confirmed in August that his contract had been extended to 2018, and told Michael Ball on his radio chat show that his contract expires in September 2018. In March 2019, Mead confirmed that he had signed another contract to remain on Holby City for another year.

Lofty's reintroduction was publicised on 10 February 2017, when it was announced that he first appears in Spring 2017. Following his departure from Casualty, Lofty decided to retrain as a bereavement counsellor, specialising in palliative care as well as travel in Australia. It was teased that Lofty could be "still running away from his problems". The show's acting executive producer, Simon Harper, said, "It's thrilling [...] to have Lee make the 'trip upstairs' as Lofty. Keller Ward is going through some dark times, so Lofty's trademark warmth and kindness will come at just the right moment." Mead later tweeted his excitement and branded this "the next chapter" of his career. Mead's move to Holby City was criticised by his former co-stars, Henderson and Crystal Yu (who portrays Lily Chao), who hoped he would reprise the role in Casualty. Mead began filming on 20 February 2017, with his first episode scheduled for May 2017. Mead felt "nervous" on his first day of filming, but felt more confident after a few scenes. He added that he missed portraying Lofty as he is a "great character". In August 2017, Mead reflected on his transition from Casualty to Holby City, stating that he is able to be at home daily. He also commented, "I think during the six months I've been at Holby [City], I've had bigger stories than in two years in Casualty!"

Lofty is introduced to Holby City in the nineteenth series episode "Project Aurous", broadcast on 16 May 2017. The actor teased that Lofty would return "with a punch". He arrives for a shift on Keller ward as an agency nurse and first appears straddling a patient whose heart has stopped, giving them CPR. Mead labelled the entrance "punchy". While travelling, the character regained his confidence and returns stronger, having met new people who have helped him. Lofty struggles in his shift and has a "crisis of confidence". He then bumps into Robyn. Henderson guest starred in the episode for Lofty's introduction. Mead told Duncan Lindsay, a reporter for the Metro, that at time of bumping into Robyn, Lofty "keeps getting stuff wrong and he's on the brink of giving up again". Robyn reminds Lofty of his qualities and reignites his passion for nursing. The actor enjoyed the scene, calling it "beautiful". Lofty initially decides to leave after his agency shift so he can continue travelling, but after realising how much he misses the profession, he decides to stay. Sacha then offers Lofty a permanent position as a nurse on Keller ward. Mead enjoyed his introduction to Holby City, describing it as "nice" and "really exciting". In his second episode, Lofty is featured assisting in theatre, which Mead described as a big moment for him. On his two episode introduction, Mead said, "There were a lot of hours filming – about 140 in about two or three weeks! I feel lucky to have big storylines to get back into."

Mead told Laura-Jayne Tyler of Inside Soap that he had filmed a guest appearance in Casualty, which features Lofty attending the funeral of Caleb Knight (Richard Winsor), who was killed off in a recent episode. He added that he hopes for another crossover appearance and suggested that Lofty could visit Robyn. Lofty guest stars in the thirty-first series episode, "Do Not Stand at My Grave and Weep", broadcast on 17 June 2017.

=== Sexuality ===
Lofty's first storyline in Holby City sees his sexuality explored. Kent spoke with Mead about Lofty's sexuality and the actor explained that he did not want to produce a story about Lofty struggling to come out because it would not reflect a "modern society". He told Victoria Wilson of What's on TV that they wanted to focus on the "matter of fact" aspect to the story and how the audience discover a new side of Lofty. Mead was happy to portray the character as gay, but did not want him to be defined by his sexuality. He added that director Jermaine Julian helped him with the storyline. Mead enjoyed the storyline and felt that it eased him back into the role as well as helping to reestablish the character. He also liked exploring Lofty's personal life since it has not previously been explored.

While travelling, Lofty enters a relationship with Alice Dujon (Tiana Benjamin) who helps him "find himself and rebuild his confidence". This is explored in the character's second episode when Alice's brother, Lenny Dujon (Micah Balfour), is admitted onto the ward. Lenny reveals to Dom and Sacha that Lofty and Alice were engaged, but he jilted Alice at the altar. Mead explained that Lofty is angry with Lenny for revealing his secret to his new colleagues. In promotional interviews, Mead teased a plot twist in the storyline, and in the episode, it emerges that Lofty and Lenny had a secret relationship. Lofty later confides in Sacha about his sexuality. Mead understood that Lofty wants to keep his sexuality private, which is the reason that he only confides in Sacha.

=== Relationship with Dom Copeland ===
When Lofty joins Holby City, he clashes with cold CT2 doctor Dominic "Dom" Copeland (David Ames) who dislikes Lofty's friendly personality. Mead explained that Dom is a different person to Lofty, so struggles to understand him. Producers did not create a friendship between the characters, but Mead suggested that a friendship was possible. Dom's previous storyline sees him abused by his former partner, Isaac Mayfield (Marc Elliott); when Lofty discovers this, he tries to support Dom. The characters later establish a friendship, which Mead thought would be "interesting" to watch. Mead liked acting with Ames, commenting that it is fun "seeing how [their friendships] all unfolds." Ames also stated that he liked Lofty and Dom's relationship and commented, "Lofty has reminded [Dom] that people can be good and kind. It's really lovely to see." In August 2017, Holby City series producer Kate Hall confirmed that Lofty and Dom's story would develop into a "slow-burning love story". She explained that Lofty would display a level of "resilience and kindness" towards Dom which would become the centre of their relationship. On the story, Hall commented, "It's gorgeous, measured, not rushed and it's respectful of the fact that Dominic has been so badly damaged by Isaac". Ames explained that their relationship would a long-running plot as Lofty is shy and unsure, while Dom has a history of destructive relationships. Despite this, he hoped that the audience would warm to the relationship.

The storyline begins when Sacha tells Dom about Lofty's sexuality causing Dom to question whether there is a connection between him and Lofty. When Lofty gifts Dom two show tickets, his suspicions are further aroused. Dom's mother, Carole Copeland (Julia Deakin), is admitted to the hospital and encourages Dom to speak to Lofty. In the staff-room, Dom kisses Lofty, but Lofty rejects him. Mead explained that Lofty rejects Dom because he is surprised by his actions. He added that Lofty did not realise that Dom has feelings for him. He also told a reporter from What's on TV that Lofty wants security in his relationship. Three weeks later, Lofty overhears Dom discussing a crush and presumes that Dom is referring to him. Lofty is embarrassed and becomes jealous when Dom squashes his theory. An Inside Soap reporter observed that Lofty is "struck down with a case of the green-eyed monster!" Lofty realises his feelings for Dom, but decides not to confront them. Mead opined that Lofty had created a complex situation for himself. The actor also suggested that there has not been a good moment for Lofty and Dom to start a relationship. Lofty is involved in a charity fun run in memory of Arthur Digby (Rob Ostlere). Lofty is envious of Dom's relationship with Freddie Chapel (Aaron Fontaine), who also runs the race. A car crashes into the runners during the race and Lofty panics that Dom is hurt; Dom is fine, but Freddie is injured. When Lofty notices that Dom is upset, he warns him not to become too involved with Freddie. Mead explained that Dom struggles to understand Lofty's change in attitude. Mead confirmed that Lofty would transfer to the Acute Assessment Unit (AAU) after Lofty and Dom's friendship turns "awkward". He added that Lofty could return to Keller ward in the future.

Mead and Ames both pointed out that Lofty and Dom had developed an on-off relationship, which Ames thought was because Dom had a volatile relationship with Isaac. He told Tyler (Inside Soap), "Lofty wants to support Dom but it's about Dom trusting someone again". Ames confirmed that the characters would be "heading in the right direction" even if they encountered any problems. He teased that there would be "some lovely interactions" between Lofty and Dom. Ames compared Lofty and Dom's relationship to the relationship between Ross Geller (David Schwimmer) and Rachel Green (Jennifer Aniston) in the American sitcom Friends. He enjoyed portraying the happier scenes between Dom and Lofty after spending 18 months portraying more dramatic stories and named the story's "silliness and lightness" as his personal highlight. The actor enjoyed working with Mead and felt that they were professionally similar.

Lofty and Dom's relationship is tested by the arrival of Lofty's grandmother, Sheilagh Chiltern. Wanda Ventham was cast as Sheilagh and is introduced in January 2018. Sheilagh is admitted to the AAU following a fall in the garden; when Lofty becomes upset, Dom supports him. Lofty then starts to question his relationship with Dom. Sheilagh's deteriorating health means that she cannot be released from hospital. Mead explained that Lofty is concerned about his grandmother's safety and wants to make her "comfortable and safe". Lofty considers moving Sheilagh into a care home, but she is adamant that she does not want that. Dom suggests that Lofty and Sheilagh move into his flat with him. Mead told Victoria Wilson of What's on TV that Lofty "freaks out a bit" over Dom's proposal, but understands that it is "a kind gesture". Lofty tells Dom that he is not comfortable with living with Dom and Sheilagh, which makes Dom question whether Lofty has feelings for him.

=== Marriage ===
The characters later become engaged as a way of showing their commitment to each other. Lofty decides to propose to Dom after being given his grandfather's ring by Sheilagh. Mead explained that Lofty takes Sheilagh's words "literally" and believes that he has a future with Dom. Lofty confides in Carole about his feelings for Dom and asks for her approval. Mead thought this was nice as it was not common anymore. He commented, "Lofty's very old fashioned and has got these traditions that he stands by. He's very much a gentleman and a bit old school really, which is not seen so much these days." After seeking Carole's approval, Lofty is disappointed when she tells him that Dom would not be suitable for marriage. Mead said that Lofty does not want to hear this, but is "undeterred" in his decision to propose. Lofty has to hide Carole from Dom throughout the shift and then has to lie about why she is at the hospital. However, when Carole and Dom do speak, she reveals that Lofty is planning to propose. Lofty and Dom want to visit Tuscany in Italy, so Lofty attempts to recreate the hospital's garden with "lemons, bunting and bicycles" to resemble this. Knowing that Lofty plans to propose, Dom also proposes to Lofty. On the double proposal, Mead said, "it's a very modern proposal, very sweet and shows what real love is all about." The actor also explained that Lofty chooses to propose because he wants Dom to feel happy and certain about their future, which has never happened to Dom.

Lofty and Dom marry in a double wedding ceremony with Jason Haynes (Jules Robertson) and Greta Allinson (Zoe Croft). The wedding is officiated by Henry de Havilland, portrayed by television personality and priest Richard Coles. The ceremony was created as a happier moment following a series of darker storylines and Harper called the wedding a "joyous episode celebrating love and commitment in all their diverse forms". Shortly afterwards, Lofty leaves to care for his grandmother. It was confirmed in March 2019 that the marriage would suffer problems following Dom's discovery that he is adopted and consultant Ange Godard (Dawn Steele) is his biological mother. Since Lofty is not around, Dom does not share his problems, creating "a big breakdown in communication" between the husbands. Ames explained that the relationship would suffer because Dom is not giving the marriage his full attention at what is "a pivotal time for a couple".

In an interview with Digital Spy, Ames reflected on the pairing of Lofty and Dom and thought that they are perfect together. He commented, "Dom pushes Lofty to think differently and Lofty pushes Dom to feel differently – to not be so reactive, and not be so fiery." He added that although he loves the pairing, he would be willing for Lofty and Dom to separate for the sake of exciting stories. Ames also expressed his delight at working with Mead, who said managed to make Lofty a "beautiful, but flawed, character".

== Reception ==
Mead was nominated for Favourite Newcomer at the 2014 TV Times Awards, but lost out to Emmerdale's Amelia Flanagan for her role as April Windsor. He was also nominated for Best Newcomer at the 20th National Television Awards in January 2015, but lost out to EastEnders' Maddy Hill for her role as Nancy Carter. Lofty's pairing with Dom was nominated for Best Soap Couple at the 2018 Digital Spy Reader Awards; they came in eleventh place with 2.8% of the total votes.

"Lofty (Lee Mead) is hopeless; far from assertive and prone to being distracted by the personal lives of patients. He's too forgiving of an incompetent agency nurse and his day is strewn with irreversible errors."

— Critic Alison Graham on Lofty's departure.

David Brown, writing for the Radio Times, liked Lofty in his first episode but believed that he "gets off to a bad start". He also described Mead as "a charismatic addition to the ED". However, Radio Times's Alison Graham disagreed and branded Lofty an "idiot" on multiple occasions. She also dubbed Lofty "the Care Bears version of Dr Tanya Byron". Wade (Radio Times) labelled Lofty the "Band 5 Nurse who stumbled his way into a job in the ED." Wade named Lofty's memorable moments as his introduction, his suspension after taking a patient from the hospital, and being "hailed a hero" after risking his life to save a patient. Sophie Dainty of Digital Spy found the character "loveable". James Brinsford (Metro) was surprised when Mead joined the cast as a nurse rather than "the 'famous person who’s befallen a nasty accident' that brings to TV those people who you wondered what happened to." He observed that the character became "a viewer favourite" during his tenure on Casualty.

Henderson praised Mead's casting and said, "adding Lee Mead to the cast is gonna [sic] be fab [because] he's such a nice energy to have around." Daniel Kilkelly of Digital Spy said that Lofty's introduction was "a very unusual way to bring in a new character". Brown also described Lofty's arrival as "unusual". Graham praised a series 29 episode which focused around Lofty, Robyn Miller and Max Walker. She later developed a negative view of Lofty's actions, quipping that "Lofty simply must know what is wrong at the heart of the household" and that he "has a hotline to everyone's innermost feelings". She later sarcastically noted that Lofty is "all-seeing, all-knowing" and able to "[look] within the soul of an 11-year-old boy", who was "his intellectual equal". She did, however, praise Lofty's "calm common sense" as he "[came] to the rescue" following the black alert at a nearby hospital.

Mead revealed that he and Beck had received a positive reaction to their characters' friendships from the audience. Catherine Kielthy of What's on TV described Lofty's shift running the ED as a "horror shift". Graham noted that the death of agency nurse, Diana, left Lofty "[moping] in extremis" and "tormented by guilt". She added that it made him "[roam] the emergency department looking like a tormented poodle". At the time of his departure, Mead revealed that the character had made "such an impact" because he is "connected" to the public.

In May 2017, Mead told Dainty (Digital Spy) that he had received positive feedback on Twitter from fans of the character, commenting that "I just feel really fortunate that Lofty has connected with the public for the two years I did on Casualty." He added that there was "lots of excitement" surrounding Lofty's reintroduction. Mead was approached at concerts about the character, with fans asking him whether he would reprising the role. TV Choice reporters placed Lofty's Holby City introduction at number four on its list of "Six shows you must not miss!", commenting that Lofty's appearance served as a "surprise". Dainty (Digital Spy) called the introduction "exciting". Viewers were surprised to discover Lofty's sexuality and expressed their delight at his sexuality being explored. Mead and Ames received positive feedback from Lofty's sexuality storyline, although they have also received homophobic comments. Ames stated that he had received several tweets from fans who liked Lofty and Dom's relationship. Tyler (Inside Soap) felt that Lofty and Dom's friendship and romance complimented Dom's previous abusive relationship.
