= Exile (Casualty) =

- Casualty episode
- Episode no.: Season 29; Episode 32
- Directed by: Steve Hughes
- Written by: Kelly Jones
- Original air date: 16 May 2015
- Running time: 50 minutes

Guest appearances
- Gregory Foreman as Louis Fairhead; Florian Ghimpu as Alex Anghelescu; Crina Semciuc as Sofia Constantin; Mihai Gruia Sandu as Razvan Ionesco; George Pistereanu as Cristian Vaduva; Gabi Spahiu as Police Officer; Andreea Vasile as Nurse; Elisa Calin as Flatmate; Tudor Rosu as Boy in Tunnel; Sofia Parea Dominique as Girl in Tunnel

Episode chronology
← Previous "The Department of Secrets"	Next → "Against the Odds"
- Casualty series 29

"Exile" is the thirty-second episode of the twenty-ninth series of the British medical drama Casualty. It was written by Kelly Jones, directed by Steve Hughes, and produced by Jonathan Phillips. "Exile" first aired on 16 May 2015 on BBC One in the United Kingdom. The plot sees Charlie Fairhead (Derek Thompson) and Connie Beauchamp (Amanda Mealing) travel to Bucharest to help Charlie's son Louis (Gregory Foreman), who has become a heroin addict and is planning on selling his kidney to pay his debts.

Executive producer Oliver Kent initially had doubts about taking the show away from its regular setting, as he thought it might appear "odd". Unlike other episodes, "Exile" only follows one story, as opposed to multiple plots. Producers decided that Louis would be central to the story, as putting him in jeopardy meant Charlie had to come to his rescue. The producers also wanted to send Charlie and Connie on a metaphorical rollercoaster, before reaching pivotal points in their story arcs. Kent hoped "Exile" would become "a talking point" among viewers in the future. The episode was filmed on-location in Romania in late 2014, marking the first time an entire episode of Casualty has been filmed abroad.

Scenes from the episode were first seen in an April 2015 trailer for the show, while two 30-second trailers were released shortly ahead of its broadcast. "Exile" was seen by 5.28 million viewers, making it the 12th most watched programme on BBC One for the week ending 17 May 2015. It received positive reviews from critics, with Alison Graham of Radio Times calling it "a positive thing for the characters" and Sarah Ellis of Inside Soap branding the plot "a heart-wrenching story".

== Plot ==
Charlie Fairhead (Derek Thompson) and Connie Beauchamp (Amanda Mealing) travel to the Bucharest University Emergency Hospital to visit Charlie's son Louis (Gregory Foreman) who has been beaten up. At the hospital, Louis's doctor Alex Anghelescu (Florian Ghimpu) tells Charlie that Louis's injuries are extensive, but not dangerous. Louis is surprised by Charlie's appearance and his girlfriend Sofia (Crina Semciuc) admits that she called him. Charlie tells Louis he brought the money Sofia asked for, assuming it is for hospital fees. Connie checks Louis over and questions Alex about his treatment. He tells her that Louis is addicted to heroin, and Charlie overhears. He returns to the ward to find Louis has gone. Alex believes Louis is staying at an old warehouse, which is home to many other drug addicts, and offers them medical kits, so they can treat those inside and ask for information. Charlie tries to stop Louis from leaving with drug dealer Cristian Vaduva (George Pistereanu), but Connie pulls him out of the way of the car.

Charlie and Connie go to the warehouse, where they find many homeless people sheltering in a series of tunnels. Charlie meets Razvan Ionesco (Mihai Gruia Sandu), who tells him that Cristian arranges for people to sell their kidneys in order to pay their debts. Charlie becomes frustrated and argues with Connie, questioning why she pulled him away Cristian's car and her reasons for coming to Romania. He calls her a glory hunter, as she has put her ambition before her own daughter. Connie replies that he has done the same. Charlie reports Louis's disappearance to the police, and learns he was arrested for drug offences at a nightclub. Charlie is given another address for Louis and he finds Louis's possessions at a nearby flat. He then goes to the nightclub, while Connie visits Alex and they have sex. Cristian checks on Louis, who assures him that he will pay his debt by donating his kidney.

Charlie confronts Cristian at the nightclub, but he is thrown out. Cristian hits Sofia when she tries to go to Charlie's aid. The following morning, Connie finds a beaten Sofia on Alex's doorstep. She calls Charlie, who meets them at Alex's house. Sofia explains that Louis was already using heroin when they met and that he is at a clinic outside of the city. Connie interrupts the operation in time and finds Alex performing the surgery. Charlie pushes Alex away, causing Alex to cut a blood vessel. Connie helps to stop the resulting bleed. Alex explains that he works for Cristian and was given no choice about the surgery. With Cristian on his way, Charlie gets Louis into a car, while Connie stays behind to look after Sofia. Cristian shoots at Charlie's car and attempts to run him off the road. Charlie drives into Cristian's car, causing it to flip over, and Charlie drives away.

== Production ==
=== Conception and development ===
On 17 April 2015, Sophie Dainty of Digital Spy reported that Casualty would shortly be airing an episode set in Romania, focusing on Charlie Fairhead (Derek Thompson) and Connie Beauchamp (Amanda Mealing) in their search for Charlie's drug addicted son Louis (Gregory Foreman), who has been admitted to a hospital after being attacked.

When the crew began discussing the episode, executive producer Oliver Kent had doubts about taking the drama out of its regular setting, as he thought it would appear "odd". Producer Jonathan Phillips agreed that it was not something they took lightly, as Holby is their characters' home. Series producer Erika Hossington said the first step was how they would make that achievable and how it would impact in terms of the story. Unlike typical Casualty episodes, "Exile" follows one story, as opposed to multiple story arcs and characters. Kent thought it worked well because it focuses on two of the show's most important characters – Charlie and Connie – sorting out their friendship, as well as Charlie's relationship with his son Louis, which the audience knows well. Hossington explained that Louis is central to the story. Regular viewers would have been aware that Louis has been travelling around Europe, and the idea of the episode was to put him in jeopardy, so Charlie would have to come to his rescue.

"It's a standalone action-adventure episode that's really pared down. In Romania we get right up close to Charlie in a way we never have before. By the end you'll know a lot more about him! It's a beautiful rough diamond story."

— Thompson on the storyline and the effect it has on his character.

Phillips stated that the goal of the episode was to take Charlie and Connie on "an absolute rollercoaster", before reaching a pivotal point in their respective story arcs. Kent pointed out that the story is all about Connie and Charlie and that it goes far deeper than they usually go in the episodes. The secrets between the characters would remain with them and the audience. Kent hoped "Exile" would become "a talking point" among viewers in the future, saying "I think it has all the elements of a classic Casualty. He added that it had suspense, great character moments and Charlie and Connie doing what they do best, which is looking after people and each other.

The episodes broadcast before "Exile" had focused on Connie hitting her lowest point, after she was accused of murder and imprisoned. Charlie supported Connie through her ordeal, as he is her only friend. Thompson thought that they had formed a sibling-like relationship, despite being opposites. Mealing explained that as Charlie has supported Connie, she feels that she has to go to Romania with him. The actress described their trip as "a strange, tangent journey" and said "a very different Connie" emerges. Thompson joked that Charlie and Connie appear to swap heads during their trip, as Charlie becomes more forceful whereas Connie is more cautious and caring. Mealing thought that both characters go through a rite of passage. Connie is initially there to help Charlie, but they soon clash and they tell each other some harsh truths.

Thompson did not have to do much research for the episode. As a father of two sons, he found it easy to imagine what Charlie was going through with Louis. He also told Elaine Reilly of What's on TV that he used his second-hand experience of heroin addiction to help him with the episode. He explained that he had a friend whose daughter is an addict, so he knew what his friend had been through with that. Foreman commented that going to Romania and filming the episode made him realise that they were "on to something special". Romanian doctor Alex Anghelescu (Florian Ghimpu) was introduced as a love interest for Connie during the episode. She and Alex bond and later have a one-night stand. Sarah Ellis of Inside Soap observed that since Connie returned to Holby in 2014, she had been so consumed with work that she had no time for romance. Ellis questioned whether Alex was the right man for Connie or whether she would regret getting close to him later. Thompson observed that Connie "blossoms like a rose" when she kisses Alex.

=== Filming ===
The episode was filmed on location in Bucharest and at the MediaPro Studios from late November to early December 2014. Peter Dyke of the Daily Star reported that "Exile" marked the first time an entire Casualty episode had been filmed abroad. He also reported that producers were keen to shoot more episodes abroad in the future due to the good experience. Director Steve Hughes explained that the shoot was more complicated than normal. He and some of the crew members came over shortly before filming to scout locations and start the casting process. Hossington said Hughes "relished" the chance to work on the episode, as it is "very filmic" and shot entirely on location. He had a chance to have fun with the camera and what he was doing. Hughes liked that he had the opportunity to work on a bigger scale and he made sure he worked with a director of photography and an operator that he trusted, while also using the Romanian crew, whose background is in film. He added that they wanted the episode to have a "Casualty: The Movie" feel to it.

Mealing liked the beauty of the city and directness of the Romanian people. She commented "And what was lovely was that while the crew were half-British, half-Romanian, there was no 'us and them'. It was just one unit working together as a team." Thompson was ill with bronchitis during filming, and while the winter weather did nothing to improve his condition, he called the shoot "a dream to do". He found that his illness helped him with his performance during Charlie's angry scenes. Thompson enjoyed filming the car chase at the end of the episode, which he said was "thrilling", as he was not often in the middle of the show's stunts. He also added that it was cold, as the car's rear window had been shot out. The worsening weather in Romania meant it was not safe to complete filming on the chase and it was later recreated in the UK. Towards the end of the episode, Thompson pays homage to actor Bob Hoskins's performance in the final scenes of The Long Good Friday, as Charlie accepts what is happening to him.

== Promotion and broadcast ==
"Exile" was first teased in an April 2015 trailer showcasing the show's Spring storylines, with Sophie Dainty of Digital Spy describing it as "dark". On 8 May, the BBC released a 30-second trailer for the episode titled "Unfamiliar Territories", followed by another 30-second trailer three days later. "Exile" was broadcast on BBC One on 16 May 2015.

== Reception ==
In its original broadcast, "Exile" received an overnight rating of 4.08 million viewers, equivalent to 21.6% of the total audience. This figure later rose to 5.28 million viewers, making it the 12th most watched programme on BBC One for the week ending 17 May 2015.

The episode was chosen by a reporter for The People as one of their top choices for 16 May. While Rick Fulton of the Daily Record included it in his pick of the "best shows on the small screen" for the week. Lee Mackay of the Evening Telegraph chose the episode as part of her "TV Choice" feature, and she commented "It isn't often that the Holby staff get to leave the confines of the hospital and spread their wings a little." Mackay added that Romania was "far from being a pleasant sightseeing jaunt" for Connie and Charlie. Jack Seale of The Guardian branded the episode "an away-day special" and observed that it ended with an "all-action battle with Romanian gangsters."

Alison Graham of the Radio Times also noted that it was rare for Casualty to leave its Holby setting. She also thought the setting was a positive thing for the characters, saying "taking long-established, synonymous characters a long way from their home is a worthwhile exercise. Even Connie (Amanda Mealing) doesn't seem quite so dreadful – she even appears (whisper it) to be a little bit vulnerable, particularly after she and Charlie have a showdown on a snowy pavement." Inside Soap's Sarah Ellis commented that viewers were "in for a real treat", while also calling it "a heart-wrenching story" with a "shocking conclusion". A writer for the Inside Soap Yearbook 2016 named "Exile" as one of the "best bits of May".
