= List of Casualty specials =

List of special episodes of British medical drama Casualty

Casualty is a British medical drama television series that premiered in the United Kingdom on BBC One on 6 September 1986. It is the longest-running emergency medical drama television series in the world, and the most enduring medical drama broadcast on primetime television in the world. Casualty is set in the fictional Holby City Hospital and focuses on the staff and patients of the hospital's emergency department (ED). The drama was created by Jeremy Brock and Paul Unwin, while Geraint Morris produced the first three series. The drama has aired for 40 series with over 1,000 episodes having aired in total. Holby City, a spin-off of Casualty, was commissioned in 1998 and aired from 12 January 1999 until 29 March 2022. The two shows are closely related with several crossover events occurring between them. Some crossovers broadcast between December 2004 and December 2005 are styled as episodes of Casualty@Holby City. A British police procedural drama and spin-off to Casualty, HolbyBlue was announced on 27 April 2006. It began on 8 May 2007 and was cancelled in August 2008 after 2 series and 20 episodes were broadcast.

Casualty has produced 22 special episodes, including the first webisode commissioned for a BBC continuing drama. Belinda Campbell, who executively produced the drama between 2007 and 2011, thought that webisodes would be a "new [way] to add value for our loyal fans", something which the team constantly look to do. Casualty filmed a sketch for charity telethon Children in Need in 2009, featuring charity mascot Pudsey Bear. In 2010, cast members on the show filmed a tribute to BBC soap opera EastEnders and Blue Peter presenter Joel Defries presented a segment of the show from the Casualty set. To celebrate Casualty's thirtieth anniversary, original cast members Derek Thompson and Cathy Shipton filmed a special episode, "Back to Ours", showing moments from their careers on the show. "Our Holby City" features Casualty stars George Rainsford and Michael Stevenson chatting to Holby City co-stars Jaye Jacobs and Alex Walkinshaw.

Webisodes have been created to explore characters in more detail: "The Parting of the Ways" focuses on Alistair (Joe McFadden); "Under Fire" details Sam Nicholls' (Charlotte Salt) backstory; and "Scars and Nightmares" explores the backstory of Iain Dean (Michael Stevenson). Other webisodes are designed to help progress storylines on the main show: "Short Story" explores Ruth Winters' (Georgia Taylor) stay at the hospital's psychiatric ward; "Mistletoe and Rum" follows the secret relationship between Tess Bateman (Suzanne Packer) and Adrian "Fletch" Fletcher (Alex Walkinshaw); "Nurse Factor" supports the introduction of four new student nurse characters; "Gone in Sixty Seconds" gives an insight into a bus crash; "Mrs Walker-To-Be" explores the night before Zoe Hanna (Sunetra Sarker) and Max Walker's (Jamie Davis) wedding; and "On Call" starts a storyline featuring Caleb Knight (Richard Winsor) being told he has a daughter. Some webisodes have been standalone and not followed in the main show: "The Kids Aren't Alright" focuses on Jeff Collier's (Matt Bardock) estrangement from his children; "The Spirit of Christmas" and "The First Noel" are Christmas specials; and "Radio Holby" sees Noel Garcia (Tony Marshall) become the hospital's radio DJ.

== Specials ==
No.	Title	Type of special	Directed by	Written by	Original release date
1	"The Parting of the Ways"	Webisode	Simon Meyers	David Roden	31 October 2009
2	"Children in Need special"	Charity	N/A	N/A	20 November 2009
3	"EastEnders 25th Anniversary"	Other	N/A	N/A	19 February 2010
4	"Blue Peter special"	Other	N/A	N/A	10 March 2010
5	"Short Story – Part One"	Webisode	Reza Moradi	Mark Catley	12 March 2011
6	"Short Story – Part Two"	Webisode	Reza Moradi	Mark Catley	2 April 2011
7	"Under Fire"	Webisode	Gareth Bryn	Catrin Clarke	12 April 2012
8	"The Kids Aren't Alright"	Webisode	Anne Edyvean	Matt Redd	21 July 2012
9	"Mistletoe and Rum"	Webisode	Sunetra Sarker	David P. Davis	15 December 2012
10	"Nurse Factor"	Webisode	Simon Norman	Janine H. Jones	28 December 2012
11	"Gone in Sixty Seconds"	Webisode	Jon Sen	Paul Quiney	5 January 2013
12	"Scars and Nightmares"	Webisode	Dafydd Palfrey	Asher Pirie	2 November 2013
13	"The Spirit of Christmas"	Webisode	Seán Gleeson	Henrietta Hardy	14 December 2013
14	"Radio Holby − Part One"	Webisode	Kodjo Tsakpo	Simon Norman	18 October 2014
15	"Radio Holby − Part Two"	Webisode	Kodjo Tsakpo	Ross Southard	25 October 2014
16	"Mrs Walker-To-Be"	Webisode	John Quarrell	Sarah Beeson	22 August 2015
17	"On Call"	Webisode	Jack Ryder	Kayleigh Llewellyn	10 October 2015
18	"Back to Ours"	Other	Matt Taylor	N/A	20 August 2016
19	"The First Noel"	Webisode	Anthony Sutcliffe	N/A	24 December 2016
20	"Our Holby City"	Other	Anthony Sutcliffe	N/A	29 March 2022

== Webisodes ==
=== The Parting of the Ways ===
External videos
- "Series 24 – Episode 9.1 – The Parting of the Ways" "The Parting of the Ways" webisode

"The Parting of the Ways" is an eight-minute webisode and the first webisode to be produced for BBC continuing dramas. The webisode was announced on 7 October 2009 and was released on 31 October. It is written by David Roden, directed by Simon Meyers and produced by Rebecca Hedderly. As Polly Emmerson (Sophia Di Martino) continues to be stalked by homeless man Alistair (Joe McFadden), the webisode follows the events between the series 24 episodes "Regrets" and "Every Breath You Take". The webisode, which is from the viewpoint of Alistair, focuses on the "gritty world of life on the streets" and Alistair's struggle with his mental well-being as Polly reports him to the police. Executive producer Belinda Campbell praised Di Martino, McFadden and Roden, and described the webisode as "a really special viewing opportunity for die-hard Casualty lovers". She thought that "The Parting of the Ways" would be a good alternative method of exploring a "a hitherto unseen world". She also described the special as "innovative". McFadden liked the alternative method of filming and enjoyed exploring his character in more detail. He also liked being able to portray a grittier version of the drama.

=== Short Story ===
External videos
- "Casualty Short Story – 12 March"; The first part of "Short Story"
- "Casualty Short Story – 2 April"; The second part of "Short Story"
- "Casualty red button: Exclusive behind the scenes video" A behind-the-scenes video about "Short Story"
- "Casualty: Short Story Two Teaser"; Actress Georgia Taylor discusses the second part of "Short Story"

"Short Story" is a two-part webisode focusing on Ruth Winters' (Georgia Taylor) stay at the hospital's psychiatric ward. The first part of the webisode was released on 12 March 2011, and the second part of the webisode was released on 2 April 2011. The special is directed by Reza Moradi and produced by Nicola Larder. Part 1 of the webisode features physciatrist Andrew Brookfield (Matthew Kelly) trying to bond with Ruth, while dealing with an upset patient and a delivery of a horse from an unstable patient. Taylor found herself not heavily involved in the first part of "Short Story" and is featured in the back of several scenes. Moradi was unsure about filming with a horse and wanted to use an alternative animal. Initially, Taylor wondered how they would include a horse in the scene, suggesting that they might use computer-generated imagery (CGI) or a "robotic horse". Kelly, who had equinophobia, received a phone call from his agent, before he had read the script, and she informed him of the use of a horse. However, after meeting Billy, the horse used in filming, he called him "one of the most gorgeous creatures I have ever seen in my entire life". The horse was only used for one morning. Due to the use of a horse in filming, there were several health and safety procedures. Taylor stated that whenever she approached the horse, a health and safety officer would ask her to move away. Larder enjoyed the filming of "Short Story".

Part 2 of the webisode follows Ruth as she struggles to adapt to her new environment and meets Carl, a man who is billed as "a mysterious stranger on the Psychiatric Ward" by a BBC Online contributor. Taylor described Carl as a "charismatic [and] enigmatic" character, who Ruth would become "intrigued" by. Before the release of the special, Taylor confirmed that there would be a "twist" at the end of Part 2. In the special, Ruth is encouraged to think outside the box by Carl and at the end of the special, it is revealed that nurse Charlie Fairhead (Derek Thompson) asked Carl, the ward's window cleaner, to speak to Ruth so that she would start taking her medication.

The specials were filmed on-location over two days. Filming took place at the same location that the show used when filming the psychiatric ward for the main show. Taylor filmed on-location for four months and while she enjoyed the experience, she grew tired of using a honeywagon and missed her dressing room. To help him when rehearsing, Kelly colour coded his script, separating his lines, stage directions and voiceovers into different colours.

=== Under Fire ===
External videos
- "Under Fire – Red Button Special" "Under Fire" webisode
- "Under Fire – teaser" A promotional trailer for "Under Fire"

"Under Fire" is a webisode focusing on the backstory of Sam Nicholls (Charlotte Salt), which was released on 14 April 2012. The webisode was announced on 28 March 2012, and follows Sam's experience as a medic at Camp Bastion in Afghanistan before she joined Holby City Hospital. Michael Stevenson makes his first appearance as Corporal Iain Dean in the special. Sam and Iain have an affair, which Salt described as "a moment of comfort". She explained that Sam and Iain were in "a different world out there in Afghanistan". As Sam treats victims of a suicide bombing, she becomes concerned when a patient becomes "agitated" and reaches for a device in their pocket. A show spokesperson explained that Sam makes a "split-second decision" with severe consequences. Producers created the special episode so they could "explain Sam's brusque bedside manner and brave but impulsive decision-making". The webisode was filmed at an Army barracks in Cardiff during Army training. Executive producer Johnathan Young wanted to explore the backstory and actions of Sam, whom he described as "one of [the show's] most colourful characters", and felt that the webisode would be beneficial in doing so. He stated that it is obvious that Sam has "a troubled past" and hoped that they could explore Sam's secrets.

=== The Kids Aren't Alright ===
External videos
- "The Kids Aren't Alright: Red Button Special" "The Kids Aren't Alright" webisode
- "The Kids Aren't Alright – Teaser"; A promotional trailer for "The Kids Aren't Alright"

"The Kids Aren't Alright" is a webisode that was released on 21 July 2012 between part one and part two of the "#HolbyRiot" two-parter episodes, which were first broadcast on 21 July and 22 July respectively. The webisode was announced on 29 June 2012, when it was scheduled to be released on 14 July. "The Kids Aren't Alright" explores the relationship between married paramedics Kathleen "Dixie" Dixon (Jane Hazlegrove) and Jeff Collier (Matt Bardock) and Jeff's estrangement from his children. When their ambulance becomes immobile due to the surrounding riots, rioter JJ (Sami Larabi) escapes from police custody and hides in the ambulance. A fight between Jeff and JJ erupts, leaving Jeff injured. As Dixie treats Jeff, he discusses his estrangement from his children, stating that they are estranged because Jeff has not informed them about his sham marriage to Dixie. Dixie is "shocked" by Jeff's confession and persuades him to contact his children. Young wanted to explore Jeff and Dixie's marriage and felt that the webisode gave him the opportunity to do this. On creating webisodes, Young commented, "We're always looking for new ways to add value for our loyal fans".

=== Mistletoe and Rum ===
External videos
- "Mistletoe and Rum – behind the scenes" A behind-the-scenes video about "Mistletoe and Rum"
- "Trailer: Mistletoe and Rum"; A promotional trailer for "Mistletoe and Rum"

"Mistletoe and Rum" is a webisode focusing on the relationship between nurses Tess Bateman (Suzanne Packer) and Adrian "Fletch" Fletcher (Alex Walkinshaw), which was released on 15 December 2012. The webisode was announced on 12 December, and is directed by cast member Sunetra Sarker. It follows the ED's nursing staff celebrating Christmas at the pub, and as the nursing staff celebrate, Fletch and Tess spend time together outside the pub. They are interrupted by a homeless man who needs emergency treatment when he goes into a hypoglycaemic coma. Young wanted to explore Tess and Fletch's relationship further and thought that the webisode was "an ideal opportunity" to do that. He looked forward to the audience reaction to the webisode. Sarker found directing the webisode a challenge, although she found it enjoyable and liked working with each department. She added, "It's a treat for all the fans that follow the show. I was thrilled to be able to make it."

=== Nurse Factor ===
External videos
- "Nurse Factor" "Nurse Factor" webisode

"Nurse Factor" is a webisode created to introduce four new student nurse characters — Ally Hunter (Rebecca Newman), Aoife O'Reilly (Gemma-Leah Devereux), Jamie Collier (Daniel Anthony) and Robyn Miller (Amanda Henderson) — to the series in January 2013. The webisode follows the student nurses on the night before their first shift in the ED. Producers also created Twitter accounts for each character to provide a "dramatic insight into the characters' thoughts and feelings". Young decided to create the webisode as he believed it would suit the theme of the Twitter accounts. He also felt the webisode would be "a great opportunity" for the audience to understand the characters.

=== Gone in Sixty Seconds ===
External videos
- "Trailer: Gone in 60 Seconds"; A promotional trailer for "Gone in Sixty Seconds"

"Gone in Sixty Seconds" is a webisode featuring paramedics Jeff Collier (Bardock) and Kathleen "Dixie" Dixon (Hazlegrove) arriving at the site of a coach crash. The webisode was announced on 3 January 2013, and was released on 5 January. The coach contains schoolchildren returning from a skiing trip. An official episode synopsis states that Jeff would be shocked and unprepared by the coach crash.

=== Scars and Nightmares ===
External videos
- "Trailer: Scars and Nightmares – 2nd November 2013"; A promotional trailer for "Scars and Nightmares"

"Scars and Nightmares" is a webisode marking Remembrance Day and focusing on the backstory of Iain Dean (Stevenson), which was released on 2 November 2013. The special was announced on 1 November, and sees Iain and Sam Nicholls (Salt) visit former colleague Kenny in a PTSD rehabilitation centre. Iain and Sam's relationship is also revisited. Executive producer Oliver Kent wanted to explore the backstory and relationship shared between Iain and Sam, and thought that the special was "a great opportunity" to do that and provide the audience with "something extra".

=== The Spirit of Christmas ===
External videos
- "Trailer: The Spirit of Christmas"; A promotional trailer for "The Spirit of Christmas"

"The Spirit of Christmas" is a Christmas-themed webisode focusing on Big Mac (Charles Dale) and Noel Garcia (Tony Marshall) as they solve a festive mystery after a night of drinking. Noel believes that he has spotted a reindeer in their lounge and Big Mac believes that he has seen a Christmas elf in their bathroom. When they search their house, they discover Ania, a young woman hiding in the bathroom. Kent stated that Mac and Noel become "anxious detectives" as they try to understand who is in the bathroom. He added, "This exclusive Red Button episode gives an insight into just what happens the morning after the night before, but with a festive twist."

=== Radio Holby ===
External videos
- "Radio Holby – Part 1"; The first part of "Radio Holby"
- "Radio Holby – Part 2"; The second part of "Radio Holby"

"Radio Holby" is a two-part webisode following Noel Garcia (Marshall) becoming the DJ at the hospital's radio station. Team researcher Ross Southard pitched the webisodes "Radio Holby" to producers in 2014, who accepted his idea. Since pitching the idea, Southard has won the "Team Member of the Year" award at the BBC Production Awards. "Radio Holby" is directed by Kodjo Tsakpo, while Simon Walton acts as the director of photography. Part one of the webisodes is written by script editor Simon Norman, and part two is written by Southard. Part one of the special was released on 18 October, and the second part was released on 25 October. The special sees Noel try to boost team morale following the death of Jeff Collier (Bardock) by becoming the hospital DJ, a dream he has wanted to achieve. Southard described the process as "a fantastic experience" and said that he felt grateful to be offered the chance to publish his idea. Series producer Erika Hossington expressed her delight at the webisode being commissioned and praised the team, who described as "some fantastic talent", and their "passion, enthusiasm and dedication". She added, "the end result is a real treat for our website visitors and fans."

=== Mrs Walker-To-Be ===
External videos
- "She's not half as uptight as I thought she'd be!" A promotional trailer for "Mrs Walker-To-Be"

"Mrs Walker-To-Be" is a webisode released on 22 August 2015, focusing on Zoe Hanna (Sarker) and Max Walker (Jamie Davis) on the night before their wedding. The webisode coincides with the finale of series 29, and is directed by John Quarrell and written by Sarah Beeson. Seven cast members feature in the special, which continues in the following episode. Zoe has her hen do interrupted by Max's mother Greta Miller (Kazia Pelka), which could "reawaken Zoe's doubts" over her marriage to Max. Meanwhile, Max is admitted to the ED in a "surprising" twist, which could mean that Max is delayed in getting to the register office.

=== On Call ===
External videos
- "There's something I need to show you." A promotional trailer for "On Call"

"On Call" is a webisode focusing on Caleb Knight (Richard Winsor) as his former girlfriend Taylor Ashbie (Sarah Jayne Dunn) returns and introduces him to his daughter. The webisode was announced in October 2015, and was released on 10 October. A press release stated that Taylor "definitely leaves her mark" when she arrives in Holby and that Cal would get "more than he bargained for when Taylor presents him with a baby". Winsor explained that Cal's feelings for Taylor "come flooding back" after she returns. The actor called the webisode "essential viewing". The special sets up a major storyline for Caleb and his brother Ethan Hardy (George Rainsford).

=== The First Noel ===
External videos
- "The First Noel – A Casualty Pantomime" "The First Noel" webisode

"The First Noel" is a Christmas-themed webisode released on 24 December 2016. It was announced on 21 December on the show's Twitter account. It focuses on Noel finding where the staff Christmas party is being held, and features cast members dressed as Pantomime characters. Hossington also features in the special, while all cast and crew feature in a Christmas message to fans of the show.

== Charity specials ==
=== Children in Need special ===
External videos
- "Casualty Children in Need Special 2009 HD – BBC"; Children in Need special

Casualty cast members filmed a special sketch for charity telethon Children in Need in 2009. The special sees charity mascot Pudsey Bear admitted to the hospital as a patient and treated by Adam Trueman (Tristan Gemmill) and Tess Bateman (Suzanne Packer) on a ward for teddy bears. Jay Faldren (Ben Turner) is sceptical of the ward and helps Pudsey Bear's health by raising money for the charity.

== Other specials ==
=== EastEnders special ===
External videos
- "Casualty on EastEnders Live: The Aftermath"; EastEnders special

To celebrate 25 years of BBC soap opera EastEnders, five members of the Casualty cast filmed a special to congratulate them. The special was first shown during EastEnders Live: The Aftermath, a live show broadcast following EastEnders' live episode. Michael French, who appears in Casualty as Nick Jordan, stars in the special and gives a nod to his EastEnders character, David Wicks, in a scene.

=== Blue Peter special ===
In an episode of children's television show Blue Peter, first broadcast on 10 March 2010, presenter Joel Defries visits the set of Casualty. An official episode synopsis stated that Defries would reenact a scene from the show.

=== Back to Ours ===
External videos
- "Calling the shots" A promotional trailer for "Back to Ours"

"Back to Ours" is an online special which coincides with the show celebrating 30 years in production. Back to Ours, a concept based on Gogglebox and first adopted by EastEnders, features actors Derek Thompson (Charlie Fairhead) and Cathy Shipton (Lisa "Duffy" Duffin) watching a selection of their "most memorable scenes". The special was announced on 18 August 2016 and was released two days later. In the special, the actors discuss Casualty being debated in the House of Commons as well as Hollywood actress Kate Winslet's guest appearance in 1993.

=== Our Holby City ===
External videos
- "Our Holby City" "Our Holby City" webisode

"Our Holby City" is a 13 minute special released on 29 March 2022 exploring Holby City. Casualty actors George Rainsford (Ethan Hardy) and Michael Stevenson (Iain Dean) speak with Holby City co-stars Jaye Jacobs (Donna Jackson) and Alex Walkinshaw (Adrian "Fletch" Fletcher) about their experiences working on the show. The special was released on the same day that the final episode of Holby City was broadcast.
