= Amanda Henderson =

British actress

- Born: 26 September 1986 (age 40); Bury, Lancashire
- Occupation: Actress
- Years active: 2012–present
- Television: Casualty

Amanda Henderson (born 26 September 1986) is a British actress, known for her role as Robyn Miller in the BBC medical drama Casualty. She also appeared in the West End musical Oliver! and the 2012 film Les Misérables. In 2015, she accompanied performer Lee Mead on his musical tour. An appearance on Celebrity Mastermind in 2020 attracted further media attention for the actress.

== Career ==
Henderson has performed in the West End theatre in the musical Oliver! and appeared in the 2012 film Les Misérables as part of the ensemble. In 2012, Henderson was cast in her first regular role as nurse Robyn Miller in the BBC medical drama series Casualty. The character made her on-screen debut in January 2013. For her role as Robyn, Henderson was nominated in the Newcomer category at the 19th National Television Awards. The actress has also appeared as Robyn in the drama's spin-off series, Holby City. She first appeared in a 2017 episode, before returning for episodes in 2018 and 2019.

Henderson joined Casualty co-star Lee Mead on his 2015 tour, performing "Hollywood musical classics". They collaborated because they are both from musical theatre backgrounds.

In January 2020, Henderson appeared as a contestant on BBC TV's Celebrity Mastermind. While appearing on the quiz show, Henderson incorrectly answered a question about climate activist Greta Thunberg, calling her Sharon. A clip of this circulated on social media, which went viral. In response to this, Thunberg changed her name on social network Twitter to Sharon in jest. Henderson received some online backlash, which her Casualty co-star Amanda Mealing criticised and publicly called for it to stop. She is currently touring in a UK production of Come From Away.

== Filmography ==
Year	Title	Role	Notes
2011	Mount Pleasant	Candidate	1 episode
2011	Wild Bill	Steph's Funny Friend	Film
2012	Les Misérables	Ensemble	Film
2013–2023	Casualty	Robyn Miller	Series regular
2017–2019	Holby City	Robyn Miller	3 episodes

== Awards and nominations ==
Year	Ceremony	Category	Work	Result
2014	National Television Awards	Newcomer	Casualty	Longlisted

UK pantomime Awards for Best Magical Being, 2024
