= Casualty series 28 =

Twenty-eighth series of Casualty

Casualty
- Series 28
- Starring: Daniel Anthony; Matt Bardock; Oliver Coleman; Charles Dale; Jamie Davis; Jane Hazlegrove; Amanda Henderson; Chloe Howman; Tony Marshall; Lee Mead; Amanda Mealing; Azuka Oforka; Suzanne Packer; George Rainsford; Patrick Robinson; Charlotte Salt; Sunetra Sarker; Derek Thompson; Alex Walkinshaw; Richard Winsor; Crystal Yu
- No. of episodes: 48

Release
- Original network: BBC One; BBC One HD
- Original release: 3 August 2013 – 23 August 2014

Series chronology
- ← Previous; Series 27 Next → Series 29

The twenty-eighth series of the British medical drama television series Casualty commenced airing in the United Kingdom on BBC One on 3 August 2013, one week after the end of the previous series and finished on 23 August 2014. This series consisted of 48 episodes, the highest episode order since series 24.

This series saw the departures of Tom Kent (Oliver Coleman), Sam Nicholls (Charlotte Salt), Jamie Collier (Daniel Anthony), and Adrian "Fletch" Fletcher (Alex Walkinshaw), and temporary departures of Zoe Hanna (Sunetra Sarker) and Kathleen "Dixie Dixon (Jane Hazlegrove). This series also welcomed Lily Chao (Crystal Yu), Rita Freeman (Chloe Howman), Ethan Hardy (George Rainsford), Caleb Knight (Richard Winsor) and Ben "Lofty" Chiltern (Lee Mead); as well as the returns of Holby City character, Connie Beauchamp (Amanda Mealing), and paramedics Iain Dean (Michael Stevenson) and Tamzin Bayle (Gemma Atkinson).

== Production ==
Nikki Wilson served as Series Producer until episode 18, the final episode of 2013. Erika Hossington serves as the Series Producer from episode 19, the first episode of 2014. Oliver Kent is the Executive Producer for the series.

Episode 43, "Falling – Part 2", depicts a train crash and derailment, causing Fletch to sacrifice everything to save Tess. Scenes were shot at the Great Central Railway at Swithland sidings over several nights in February 2014.

Alex Walkinshaw, who plays Fletch, commented in a behind-the-scenes video, "It's a massive setup. I walked into the set, and I was really quite impressed." Director Jonathan Phillips added, "finding the location was a tough ask given what we are actually shooting." Modern carriages were hired and placed on their sides across the tracks to appear as if they had derailed, enabling filming to take place.

The theme tune that has been in place since 2001 (apart from a brief change during 2006-07), is used until episode 18. Episode 19 features a new version of the theme tune more akin to the original 1986 theme. The lead into the end music is also more akin to the original. The titles remained the same until episode 23, when a new version of the opening titles was introduced in episode 24, replacing the opening titles that were used since January 2012.

== Cast ==
The twenty-eighth series of Casualty features a cast of characters working for the NHS in the emergency department of Holby City Hospital and the Holby Ambulance Service. Daniel Anthony portrays Jamie Collier, a staff nurse, and Matt Bardock appears as Jeff Collier, a paramedic. Oliver Coleman stars as Tom Kent, an emergency pediatrician, and Charles Dale features as Big Mac, a hospital porter. Jane Hazlegrove plays Kathleen "Dixie" Dixon, a paramedic and the operational duty manager at Holby Ambulance Service. Amanda Henderson portrays staff nurse Robyn Miller and Tony Marshall and Azuka Oforka appear as Noel Garcia and Louise Tyler, the department's receptionists. Suzanne Packer features as Tess Bateman, a sister and the department's clinical nurse manager. Patrick Robinson stars as Martin "Ash" Ashford, a consultant in emergency medicine. Charlotte Salt plays Sam Nicholls, a CT2 doctor, and Sunetra Sarker portrays Zoe Hanna, a consultant and the department's clinical lead. Original cast member Derek Thompson stars as Charlie Fairhead, a senior charge nurse, and Alex Walkinshaw features as senior staff nurse Adrian "Fletch" Fletcher. Additionally, Adrian Harris appears as Norman Burnton in a recurring capacity.

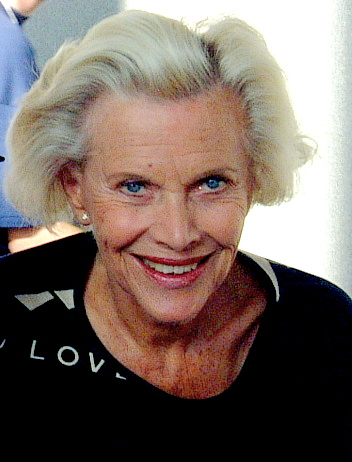
Honor Blackman guest stars in the opening episode.

On 30 July 2013, it was announced that actresses Crystal Yu and Chloe Howman had joined the show's regular cast for this series. Yu portrays junior doctor Lily Chao and debuts in the opening episode. Howman plays staff nurse Rita Freeman and joins in episode two. Executive producer Oliver Kent said that the pair would "hit the ground running and [...] create a stir in the ED". The opening episode also features a guest appearance by Honor Blackman, known for her role as a Bond girl. She plays "a feisty pensioner on a mission," with a backstory as an ambulance driver in war zones. Kent remarked that her casting was a notable one for the show and called Blackman's role "a fantastically witty and charming character". Michael Stevenson reprised his role as Iain Dean; he previously appeared in series 26 as the former Army colleague of Sam with whom she had an affair. The character is reintroduced in episode 5 as a student paramedic who is "extremely confident and may need to be kept in line". Stevenson departed in episode 30.

Jamie Davis joined the cast in episode nine as Max Walker, a "cool and laid-back" hospital porter. Episode 14 features the departures of Salt and Coleman from their respective roles as Sam and Tom. Their final episode resolves their relationship as the pair gets married before leaving. The castings of George Rainsford and Richard Winsor, in the respective roles of Ethan Hardy and Caleb Knight, were announced in September 2013. The pair are siblings and join the team as new registrars. Ethan debuts in episode 20, followed by Cal in episode 21. Davood Ghadami guest stars in two early episodes of the series as gay Iranian asylum seeker Ramin Tehrani. Producers noticed "a rather nice chemistry" between Ghadami and Anthony, so when the latter opted to leave his role as Jamie, producers reintroduced Ramin as part of his exit. Jamie departs in episode 24. Anthony's departure left an opening for a new male nurse. Kent wanted to cast Lee Mead, so he created a role for him, which the actor accepted. Mead's casting in the role of "likeable and popular" staff nurse Ben "Lofty" Chiltern was announced in September 2013. He first appears in episode 27.

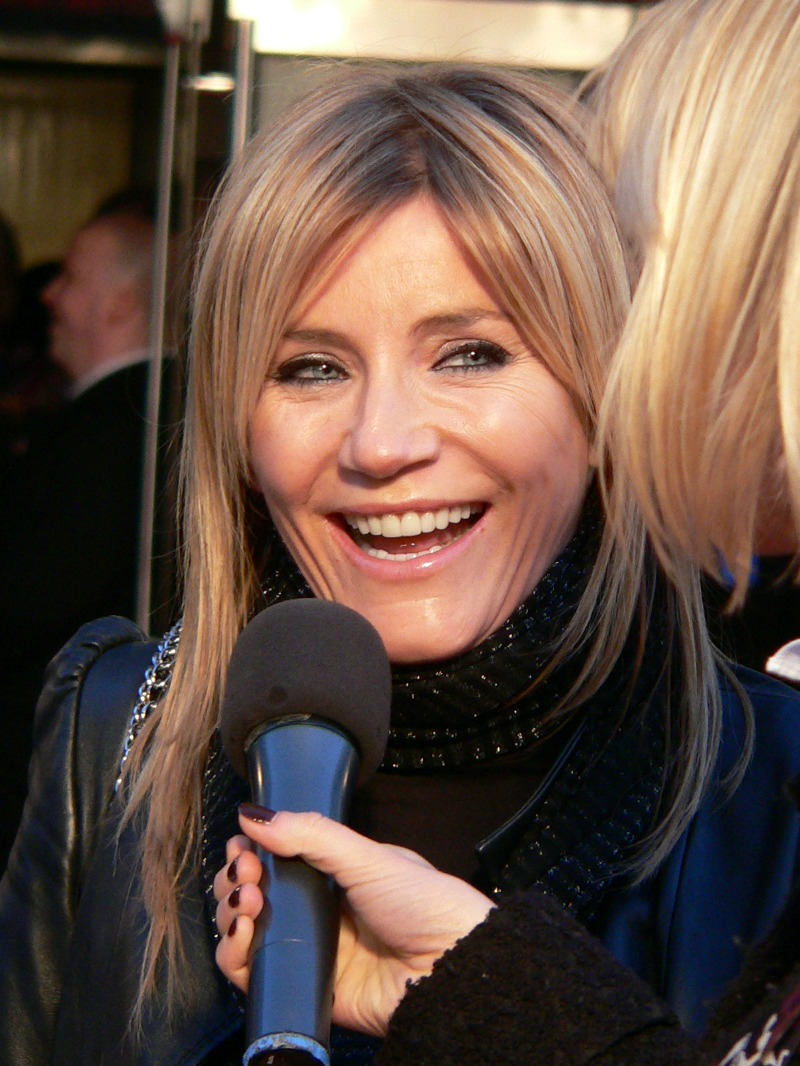
Michelle Collins starts a guest role in episode 44.

On 23 July 2013, it was announced that Amanda Mealing would reprise her role as consultant Connie Beauchamp in the series. Mealing had played Connie in the show's spin-off series Holby City for six years until 2010, and had also made appearances in Casualty during crossover events. The character is billed as "confident" but "fair" with concern about her reputation and that of the department. The actress expressed her excitement at reprising her role, while Kent dubbed Connie "an iconic character". Connie returns in episode 31; a specially-filmed trailer was released to promote her return. John Michie regularly guest stars as his Holby City character Guy Self from episode 31, as part of Connie's introduction and ongoing story. Hazlegrove took a break from her role as Dixie during this series and returned in the following series. Following Dixie's exit, Gemma Atkinson reprised her role as paramedic Tamzin Bayle in episode 38; she had last appeared in series 27. Writers used the character's return to explore Tamzin and Jeff's relationship again.

Walkinshaw's departure from the series was announced in April 2014; he left to reprise his role of Fletch in Holby City. Fletch departs in episode 43. Michelle Collins joined the show's guest cast as Samantha Kellman, a love interest for Jeff, for a two-month guest stint. She appears from episode 44. The actress was offered the role shortly after finishing filming on Coronation Street and liked the differences between the characters. Kent expressed his excitement at the character's introduction. Sarker took a break from the serial in 2014, and her character Zoe temporarily departs at the conclusion of the series. Series producer Erika Hossington used the break to create a new storyline for Zoe. She returns in the following series.

=== Main characters ===
- Daniel Anthony as Jamie Collier (until episode 24)
- Matt Bardock as Jeff Collier
- Oliver Coleman as Tom Kent (until episode 18)
- Charles Dale as Big Mac
- Jamie Davis as Max Walker (from episode 9)
- Jane Hazlegrove as Kathleen "Dixie" Dixon
- Amanda Henderson as Robyn Miller
- Chloe Howman as Rita Freeman (from episode 2)
- Tony Marshall as Noel Garcia
- Lee Mead as Ben "Lofty" Chiltern (from episode 27)
- Amanda Mealing as Connie Beauchamp (from episode 31)
- Azuka Oforka as Louise Tyler
- Suzanne Packer as Tess Bateman
- George Rainsford as Ethan Hardy (from episode 20)
- Patrick Robinson as Martin "Ash" Ashford
- Charlotte Salt as Sam Nicholls (until episode 18)
- Sunetra Sarker as Zoe Hanna
- Derek Thompson as Charlie Fairhead
- Alex Walkinshaw as Adrian "Fletch" Fletcher (until episode 43)
- Richard Winsor as Caleb Knight (from episode 21)
- Crystal Yu as Lily Chao (from episode 1)

=== Recurring characters ===
- Gemma Atkinson as Tamzin Bayle (from episode 38)
- Adrian Harris as Norman Burnton (until episode 16)
- Tahirah Sharif as Ella Ashford
- Michael Stevenson as Iain Dean (episodes 5−30)

=== Guest characters ===
- Honor Blackman as Agatha Kirkpatrick
- Michelle Collins as Samantha Kellman
- Davood Ghadami as Ramin Tehrani
- John Michie as Guy Self

== Episodes ==
No. overall	No. in series	Title	Directed by	Written by	Original release date	UK viewers (millions)
868	1	"Bedside Manners"	Jon Sen	Steve Bailie	3 August 2013	5.18
Whilst driving through the woodlands, Susan and Elliot discover a baby carrier at the side of the road. As Elliot exits the car to take a closer look he is attacked by a group of masked robbers, and in a desperate attempt to get away Susan speeds off... but it isn't long before the car flies down a hill. As Dixie and Jeff take the couple back to the hospital one of the robbers is thrown from the back of a van with a bloody mouth. Meanwhile, new trainee doctor Lily is paired up with Ash, but her bedside manner gets the better of her. Elsewhere, Dixie treats a feisty elderly lady who is knocked down by a cyclist.
869	2	"Once There Was a Way Home – Part One"	Robert Del Maestro	Frank Rickarby	10 August 2013	5.11
Just as Rita leaves for her first shift at Holby ED, the ceiling to her flat gives way. Heading upstairs she soon uncovers the reason behind the collapse – her neighbour's hoarding has gotten out of control. Rita decides to call an ambulance out and remain by her distressed neighbour before meeting two of her new colleagues, Jeff and Dixie. Meanwhile, a robbery goes horribly wrong as the victim, Ramin, breaks his ankle escaping the yard; but as he reaches the ED Jamie learns he's an illegal immigrant, and it isn't long before controversy breaks out. Ash realizes he's got a lot to teach Lily about her bedside manner.
870	3	"Once There Was a Way Home – Part Two"	Robert Del Maestro	Sasha Hails	17 August 2013	5.24
Jamie becomes further embroiled in the Iranian immigrant bringing almost the whole ED to a standstill. Zoe panics as she learns Tess is considering handing in her resignation. And Sam shows a more maternal side to her as she rescue a baby of a car crash and broken family.
871	4	"What You Believe"	Jon Sen	Chris Ould	24 August 2013	5.20
Ash joins forces with the paramedics in order to rescue two teenagers who troubled themselves tombstoning into a stretch of water scattered with debris. Elsewhere, Rita and Fletch turn detective when a young man believes he is the reincarnation of an elderly lady's brother. Tess comes face-to-face with Fletch, making her feeling clear towards the dejected nurse.
872	5	"Waiting for a Star to Fall"	Reza Moradi	David Bowker	31 August 2013	4.66
A bus swerves to avoid a car stationary in the middle of a busy road, but as it does it clips the central reserve falling to its side. New paramedic Iain soon finds a young girl, Lucy, stumbling from the bus and realizing it's close to exploding he recklessly runs... saving her life. However later, when a wounded man falters into the ED Charlie learns he had to have been involved in the crash. But why did he flee from the scene? Rita is paired with Lily in a hopeful attempt to improve her bedside manner once and for all. Tom asks Sam to move in with him.
873	6	"Scars"	Reza Moradi	Stephen McAteer	14 September 2013	5.05
Iain and Jeff's ability to get on is tested as brothers Carl and Kelvin are involved in a stabbing with a screwdriver. Elsewhere, Jamie treats a patient complaining of chest pains. As Jamie suspects the patient is faking his illness he attempts to learn why he has had such a sudden turn health wise. Is it to get his mother's attention? Also, Sam finally agrees that Tom can move in, but with her.
874	7	"Gloves Off"	Julie Edwards	Christian O'Reilly	21 September 2013	5.22
As Dee and her boyfriend Darius leave home to walk to school, Darius discovers the pills Dee is so desperately trying to keep secret. As they begin to argue Dee falls back into the road, nearly being hit by a car which swerves crashing into some bins. Dee then, however, faints cutting her hand on some glass. Later, back at the ED Fletch treats Margaret and Helen, the two ladies involved in the crash, and as he realises not only were the two ladies more interested in getting the cat to the vets, Helen is struggling to remember her words. Concerned for the two ladies, Fletch begins to question whether they should live together. Elsewhere, Zoe hooks on to the tension between Tess and Fletch... has she finally worked out the truth?
875	8	"The Longest Day"	Julie Edwards	Julie Dixon	28 September 2013	4.99
Fletch and Ash treat a sharp, feisty male named Peter, whose inability to control his diabetes had led to Charcot's foot syndrome and the beginning of an ulcer. Things go from bad to worse as Peter collapses outside the ED after seeing a face from the past, and as the team treat him Tess makes a potentially life-threatening mistake, which Fletch covers up on. Elsewhere, Si and Ade drive home from a heavy night out, but as a dog runs into the road the boys swerve the vehicle which ends up flying down an embankment... and it isn't long before the paramedics are rushing to save the lads before the car explodes.
876	9	"Love Hurts"	Steve Hughes	Andy Rattenbury	5 October 2013	5.03
Tess and the team work quickly when a pregnant woman is involved in an RTC. But with the patient's support system breaking down around her and a difficult birth, can Tess overcome her issues and support mother-to-be? Or will her clinical error prove too much to bear?
877	10	"The Memory of Water"	Steve Hughes	Tom Needham & Mark Catley	12 October 2013	5.03
When Mary discovers her husband, Andrew, collapsed in scalding water in the bath, she immediately calls for an ambulance. Back at the ED the prognosis doesn't look good and the fact Andrew has a DNR in place is also raised. The team then are forced to decide how far they must go when the mother and daughter are so at odds. Meanwhile, Jamie treats three surfers who were involved in a camper van running down a tent, but as he treats them he inadvertently opens up a love triangle. Fletch waits to see what consequences he faces for covering Tess's near fatal mistake.
878	11	"Crush Syndrome"	Tim Leandro	Kevin Rundle	19 October 2013	5.12
Rita goes out on-call with Dixie and Jeff, and her first call-out is to a patient trapped in a dangerous position at a car breakers yard. Despite Dixie and Jeff specifically telling Rita to not tell the patient that his injuries may well be fatal, she breaks the rule and tells him, which persuades him to call his estranged daughter in time. Meanwhile, Big Mac helps a male overcome his claustrophobia, and when Louise notices how well he handled the situation, she encourages him to apply for the role of Emergency Care Assistant.
879	12	"Three's a Crowd"	Tim Leandro	Kit Lambert	26 October 2013	4.76
Jeff finds himself involved in family dramas as an in-debt father and son are brought in to the ED after falling through a client's ceiling whilst plumbing. Sam and Tom's relationship continues to strengthen and before long Tom plans to propose to Sam as she treats a bride, Helen Rowlands who accidentally got hit by car on her wedding day as she was in a panic rushing around. However crisis strikes as Robyn leaks the proposal plans throughout the hospital. Big Mac is angry to learn Louise applied for his ECA position, will he turn up for his interview?
880	13	"Badge of Honour"	David Tucker	Robert Goldsbrough	2 November 2013	5.07
Iain is deeply affected when two police officers are involved in an attack, stirring up memories of his past life in the Army. Single father, Callum Bradey (George Sampson) attempts at shoplifting some medicine for his daughter, which results in him injuring himself by getting some broken wood trapped inside his leg. Back at the ED, Charlie helps Callum and the mother of his child fight for their daughter, Big Mac discovers he's got his Emergency Care Assistant job and Lily oversteps the mark by attempting to remove some broken wood from Callum's leg but instead almost making him bleed to death.
881	14	"Rock and a Hard Place"	David Tucker	Tony McHale	16 November 2013	4.95
Lily suspects anabolic steroids are being used on a Simon, a rugby player, after a bust-up during a scrum leaves one player on the ground, and another with a badly bruised hand. PC Jack Drummond arrives at the ED with a fractured leg after a confrontation at a funeral but is pursued by his colleagues father desperate for the truth of how his daughter really died.
882	15	"Between the Cracks"	Neasa Hardiman	Sally Abbott	23 November 2013	5.41
Fletch's suspicions are aroused when George and streetwise youth Skelly are admitted after falling from the roof of a house and giving false names to the paramedics. However Fletch's attempts to compromise the situation between the boys is cut when he has to face his own domestic responsibilities. Lily discharges a distressed lady without taking her mental state into consideration and this time it's Jamie who gives her a lesson in patient care.
883	16	"No Place Like Home"	Neasa Hardiman	Emma Goodwin	30 November 2013	4.65
Fletch faces further disaster as the mother of runaway George arrives at the ED, only to be told her son and Skelly have been released into the care of a man named Tommy. However it soon becomes evident to George and Skelly that they've made a huge mistake following in the footsteps of Tommy and in a desperate attempt to escape Tommy is left with life-threatening head injuries. A former wartime spy has her home bulldozed and is crushed attempting to save personal belongings, and as Sam treats her she becomes concerned as to why there's a bullet in her knee. Ash treats a family whose daughter's strange dieting has led to her eating the remains of her family cat's ashes.
884	17	"What a Wonderful Life"	Robert Del Maestro	Tim Loane	7 December 2013	4.49
Big Mac is full of nerves as he prepares for his first shift officially as Emergency Care Assistant and his first case is out to two brothers sat in agony after their car swerves off road and straight into a concrete block. To make matters worse, one of the brothers refuse medication at the scene due to their previous drugs history. A North Holby ballroom regional finals dance is cut short for a couple as the man collapses mid-dance.
885	18	"Away in a Manger"	Robert Del Maestro	Sasha Hails	14 December 2013	4.65
Sam and Tom's wedding plans are disrupted when Peter, the feisty electrician who Fletch previously treated, is electrocuted by a Christmas tree setting trouble, once again, for Fletch as he is arrested. A couple are forced to seek refuge in a barn for the birth of their baby and after resolving their differences, Sam and Tom eventually get married and leave the ED.
886	19	"For Auld Lang Syne" (Note: See also "For Auld Lang Syne" series 22)	Tim Leandro	Tony McHale	4 January 2014	5.44
Fletch witnesses an explosion at a bar and comes to the rescue of Peter Trenton, who is trapped inside the burning building. Peter is convinced Fletch is only helping him so he'll drop the charges and insists he's to be treated by another member of staff. But is this the end for Fletch? Or will Peter drop the charges? Robyn's new year gets off to a strange start as she treats a singer claiming to have lost his voice and Charlie spends a frustrating evening desperately trying to contact his son, Louie.
887	20	"Bad Timing"	Steve Hughes	Frank Rickarby	11 January 2014	6.06
Dixie is shocked as she is called out to her on-off girlfriend Carol, who has fallen down some steps hurting her wrist. However back at the ED Carol takes a turn for the worse leaving Tess and Zoe fighting to save her life. She dies. Meanwhile, a teacher is shoved through a glass-fronted stall as she tussles with a woman attempting to steal her bag, and back at the ED new doctor Ethan and Lily find further unexplained symptoms and set about discovering what really is wrong with her.
888	21	"Brothers in Arms"	Steve Hughes	Steve Bailie	18 January 2014	5.72
New locum doctor Cal arrives at the ED and it isn't long before his skills are required to a call-out with a limousine hanging precariously off a bridge and a teenage female with liver problems. Ethan tries to uncover the truth of an art student whose sight has been endangered due to flying glass.
889	22	"Keeping Schtum"	Graeme Harper	Katherine Smith	25 January 2014	5.66
Dixie and Rita's night out turn sour after they witness a woman running away from an alley in distress, and as the man turns aggressive towards Rita Dixie steps in and the man trips back, hitting his head. Then Dixie faces further problems as the man accuses her of pushing him, leading to Dixie's arrest and prosecution for assault. Meanwhile, Ethan and Cal are both as puzzled as each other over a young boy who has lost his voice.
890	23	"Blood Is Thicker Than Water" (Note: See also "Blood's Thicker" series 9, "Thicker Than Water" series 11 & "Thicker Than Water" series 17)	Graeme Harper	Anita Pandolfo	1 February 2014	6.14
Rita helps a rape victim gain the courage to come forward and press charges. Zoe helps a veteran dancer tell her daughter the truth of her adoption.
891	24	"Once in a Lifetime"	Joss Agnew	Kevin Rundle	8 February 2014	6.28
Jamie's last day revolves around a father and son who have come off their bikes whilst mountain-bike racing, but as Jamie receives medical results he discovers the son has old wounds which may suggest he's the victim of abuse. Dixie and Jeff are forced to think creatively when a man is knocked into some sinking mudflats by a bike and is slowly sinking.
892	25	"Valentine's Day Mascara"	Joss Agnew	Mark Catley	15 February 2014	6.04
Iain defies orders from Jeff and runs into a burning building in a desperate attempt to save Bobby when he runs into the building to save his fiancé. Lily becomes a magician's assistant, before throwing a drunken kiss at Ash during a Valentine's Day party and Zoe faces the prospect of losing a member of staff.
893	26	"The Great Pretender"	Reza Moradi	Tony McHale	22 February 2014	5.87
Fletch and his estranged wife argue when she doesn't feel the kids should spend the weekend with him, which leads to eldest daughter Evie escaping home and taking refuge in a dilapidated house. And it isn't long before the ceiling collapses and it's a race against time for Fletch to save his daughter. Robyn attempts to uncover why a teenage girl is lying to her mother and Lily treats a woman who wonders whether she has a good case against the council after tripping up on a paving stone.
894	27	"The Last Chance Saloon"	Reza Moradi	Matthew Barry	1 March 2014	6.15
Lily shows a softer side when Sally is rushed into hospital, however when the defiant junior doctor doesn't follow all of Ash's instructions he decides to teach her a lesson. Robyn discovers an intruder in her house and as she chases the trespasser into the next door garden she impales her foot on a rake.
895	28	"Survivor's Guilt"	Paul Murphy	Kevin Rundle	8 March 2014	6.03
Iain and Big Mac are called to a fire at a B&B, but Iain is stunned as ex-Army friend Kenny is discovered at the scene. Things go from bad to worse as Kenny's paranoia builds over his wife and he eventually rampages to the ambulance bay in search of Iain. Lily presses ahead with her accusation over Ash's workplace bullying and Lofty's keen eye helps a brother stand up for himself.
896	29	"Gravity"	Paul Murphy	Stephen McAteer	15 March 2014	6.15
Iain and Big Mac find themselves in a hostage situation when Kenny reaches breaking point. A woman heads over to complain to her neighbour about a noisy party but as she takes matters into her own hands she plummets over the balcony and is left unconscious on a car bonnet. Fletch's wife Natalie is admitted to the ED in the early stages of labour.
897	30	"The Lies We Tell"	Lee Haven Jones	Henrietta Hardy	22 March 2014	6.59
Ethan's conscience is tested when two environmental activists hide secrets from each other after they are admitted for causing a lorry to crash and explode during an anti-fracking demonstration. Rita and Zoe help a prisoner repair his broken relationship with his mother. Upstairs in the main meeting room, it is full on as Lily and Ash go head to head during the disciplinary hearing in front of Guy Self and Ash is given a formal written warning.
898	31	"Valves to Vagrants"	Lee Haven Jones	Tony McHale	29 March 2014	6.13
Connie Beauchamp struts in the ED on her first day and it isn't long before she's saving a man from prison. Zoe isn't convinced by Connie's arrival and contacts Guy Self, but doesn't get the answer she so hoped for. Ash finally decides enough is enough and takes his wayward daughter in hand... but how will she react to his tough approach?
899	32	"The Quiet Man"	Simon Massey	Jason Sutton	5 April 2014	6.02
Zoe, Connie and Lily pull together to help treat a father and his daughter after the father is impaled on a metal spike after avoiding being hit by a train, though with the daughter having ADHD and giving the staff the runaround will anyone be able to take control of the situation? Charlie helps a biker come to terms with the severity of his wife's dementia. It's not long before Zoe and Connie are fighting over how the ED should be run.
900	33	"Only the Lonely" (Note: See also "Only the Lonely" series 9, "Only the Lonely" series 16 & "Only the Lonely" series 25)	Simon Massey	Patrea Smallacombe	12 April 2014	4.77
Dixie finds herself bonding with an angry young criminal after he skids off his motorbike with the victims closely in pursuit. A prank by three girls goes badly wrong when Martha, one of the girls falls down a flight of stairs in a morbidly obese man's house. And to make matters Jim, the morbidly obese man has breathing difficulties however in order for Jeff and Dixie to treat him thoroughly he needs to be extracted from his room. Robyn is flattered when Cal helps her pass her assessment however her hopes are dashed when she witnesses Cal with another lady.
901	34	"When Nothing Else Matters"	Ashley Way	Mark Stevenson	19 April 2014	5.22
Fletch helps build bridges between a father and son after two brothers go for a midnight drive... only to swerve their car and overturn into some stationary cars. Cal begins his attempts on reeling Lily in as they work together on a self-diagnosed patient believing he has a brain tumour. And Jeff agrees to cover for Ella, Ash's daughter, after an allergic reaction to some ketamine at Robyn's house party.
902	35	"Carrot Not Stick"	Steve Hughes	Nick Fisher	26 April 2014	5.58
Dixie tells her new injured friend Leo that his mother is in a hospice and if he doesn't go to see her soon it may be too late. With a bit of creative thinking, Dixie assists Lofty and Max to help Leo spend his mother's final hours in his hands on the beach. Dixie later breaks the news to Leo his mother died peacefully in her sleep. Fletch treats a tree cutting's manager after he is crushed by a heavy branch and has a chainsaw dropped just inches from his head. Later back in the ED Fletch's suspicions arouse when the manager becomes agitated over a phone call. And Zoe and Robyn work together to uncover the history of middle-aged Ginny, who collapsed on her birthday party after sniffing cocaine.
903	36	"Who Cares?"	Ashley Way	Sally Tatchell	3 May 2014	5.74
Dixie is on her way to hear the consequences of her actions for the interference of aiding Leo whilst on shift, however on the way she is caught up by a female who is desperate for help after the man she is escaping from falls back impaling himself on a metal spike. Back at the ED all attempts to revive the man are ended and he is pronounced dead. Later, Connie raises her concerns to Ash about Zoe as she believes there were other ways to save his life before later taking Zoe for a drink, but what is Connie's game?
904	37	"Games for Boys"	Nigel Douglas	Tim Loane	17 May 2014	4.42
Fletch requires assistance from Ash when just minutes before a wedding the bride reveals a huge secret, which causes the newly-wed couple and their son to plummet through a building site costing the bride Amanda's life. However as Ash tries to administer ketamine to the injured, he discovers it missing from his medical bag. Back at Ash's house, Ella invites a few friends round for a treat, and as she reveals the ketamine stolen from her dad's bag she unfolds devastating consequences not only for herself, but also for her friends and her father.
905	38	"The Family Way"	Nigel Douglas	Tony McHale	24 May 2014	4.80
Jeff is stunned by the return of Tamzin when two warring sisters and their father end up in the ED after a horrific accident. However when the father shows more interest in one daughter than the other the sibling rivalry reaches boiling point. A bodybuilder's choice of underwear raises a few eyebrows while Tess helps a pregnant teenager stand up to her controlling father after being clipped by a car. Ash and Zoe realise Connie has been playing them off against one another.
906	39	"To Yourself Be True"	Julie Edwards	Julie Dixon	31 May 2014	5.08
Connie deals with an overbearing father who struggles to accept his son's sexuality. Barrister Anna is furious to learn she's been replaced on a case by a colleague, and as she storms out of court she collides with a cyclist. But as Jeff and Tamzin treat Anna they discover her problems are more mental than physical.
907	40	"The Dying Game"	Julie Edwards	Steve Bailie	7 June 2014	4.57
Rita finds herself in a quandary after a fire breaks out at a care home, during Fred, one of the care home's residents 100th Birthday, when his cake with sparklers on it sets fire to some coats in the care home's lounge and she believes the elderly aren't being treated with the respect they deserve. Especially when she gains access to a terminally ill patient whose ongoing medical treatment raises a number of concerns. Lily treats a male complaining of toothache; but when she learns he's abusing the drugs he's supposed to be taking by drinking alcohol she soon reveals why his pain isn't getting any better. Lofty returns to the ED and Connie raises her concern with CEO Guy Self about Zoe's competence.
908	41	"Unhinged"	Jon Sen	Sasha Hails & Mark Catley	14 June 2014	4.86
The ED begins to struggle with increasing numbers as St. James's closes its doors and casualties are coming in from across the region. A man with Dementia falls back and smashes his head on a light and after wandering off out of the ED and onto the main road and then getting hit by car, Connie is forced to save him... but is it too late? Jeff and Tamzin attend a boiler explosion. Ethan and Rita suspect a partygoer of being bulimic and a frustrated father leaves the ED without his son being treated.
909	42	"Falling – Part One"	Jon Sen	Sally Abbott	22 June 2014	5.20
Zoe struggles to keep on top of everything at the ED and decides to flee when reports of a horrific helicopter accident come through. Connie decides enough is enough and calls CEO Guy Self down to the department again. When Zoe returns to the ED, after she deals with the press, the patient she so desperately tries to keep alive dies. Following a confrontation with Guy Self for fleeing the ED Zoe steps down as clinical lead and asks that Guy Self hand over the honours and privileges of Clinical Lead to Connie Beauchamp.
910	43	"Falling – Part Two"	Simon Massey	Nick Fisher	29 June 2014	4.86
Fletch sacrifices everything to save Tess which then later resulting in his dismissal from the department and the ultimate break-up of his marriage to Natalie Fletcher after metal thieves cause a horrendous train derailment. Connie starts her first shift as clinical lead and Lily and Ethan make up, while Cal remains out of the picture. After his wife, Natalie breaks up with him, Fletch goes back in to the resus area hoping Tess would have him back but she refuses knowing what he did to Natalie.
911	44	"In the Name of Love"	Simon Massey	Trea Smallacombe	6 July 2014	5.91
Ethan's advice goes on deaf ears as a competitive father partakes in a cross-country race just hours after a car crash, and when the son is admitted after falling off an obstacle the pair find themselves uncovering home truths and secrets. The event organiser, Samantha is also admitted after slipping from a rope on a different obstacles which opens a new love interest for Jeff. And the roof of a house collapses on a pregnant woman and her boyfriend.
912	45	"First Impressions" (Note: See also "First Impressions" series 9, "First Impressions" series 18 & "First Impressions" series 20)	Richard Platt	Claire Miller	12 July 2014	4.82
Rita makes a shocking revelation as she phones and demands a divorce from the man who ruined her life outside The Hope and Anchor, but little does she know about the trouble ahead of her. And as a drugs counsellor enlists one of his former addicts help to pull off a carjacking things soon turn sour and the car collides with a van whilst on a police chase. Cal treats one of the carjacking victims, while Tess helps a leukaemia survivor come to realise she isn't yet ready to start a family. Tamzin grows jealous as Jeff and Samantha go on a date.
913	46	"The Love You Take"	Richard Platt	Kelly Jones	9 August 2014	4.93
Rita is left gobsmacked as her "dead" husband, Mark, arrives at the ED after being badly beaten up in prison, and worse follows as Mark refuses life-saving treatment unless he has a conversation with Rita; which forces Connie to pull Rita out of her interview. The staff are then left stunned themselves as they learn Rita's husband is not only still alive but in prison for sexually assaulting a 14-year-old female. As Cal and Lofty help bring an autistic son and mother closer together, Cal and Ethan continue their game of chess.
914	47	"The Sicilian Defence"	Graeme Harper	Paul Matthew Thompson	16 August 2014	5.03
Cal and Ethan pull together to work on a fascinating medical mystery involving a male with numerous undiagnosed illnesses. Rita helps a patient come to terms with a secret after a male is targeted and run down by a taxi driver, but as the staff continue to struggle to come to terms with Rita's shock revelation Rita decides to turn to alcohol. Tamzin becomes increasingly aggressive over Jeff and Samantha's relationship.
915	48	"A Life Less Lived"	Graeme Harper	Patrick Homes	23 August 2014	5.00
Zoe feels dissatisfied with life as her fortieth birthday arrives and a check-up provides negative feedback. However Zoe's day is about to get worse when she is offered a four-week holiday form from Connie. However when scaffolding collapses at a builders' yard and a son is crushed beneath the metal poles Zoe once again defies orders and heads out to treat her patients. After returning to the ED Zoe and Connie have a heated argument, and with some wise words from Molly Drover, whom Zoe previously treated with a recurring alcohol problem Zoe sees sense and decides to hand in her resignation form... but this won't stop the doctor from ever returning. Meanwhile, Cal steals Ethan's proposal idea of cost-cutting and blood transfusions but with some help from Lily Cal is soon exposed. Rita's drinking becomes obvious as the staff pick her up on her scent.
