= Lily Chao =

Fictional character from the BBC medical drama Casualty

- Casualty character
- Crystal Yu as Lily Chao
- First appearance: "Bedside Manners"; 3 August 2013
- Last appearance: "Episode 11"; 4 November 2017
- Portrayed by: Crystal Yu
- Duration: 2013–2017

In-universe information
- Occupation: Specialty registrar; (prev. CT 1/2 Doctor, Foundation Year 2)
- Family: Feng Chao (father); Li Na Chao (mother)
- Relatives: Harry Zhang (cousin); Ling (aunt)

Lily Chao is a fictional character from the BBC medical drama Casualty, played by actress Crystal Yu. She first appeared in the series twenty-eight episode "Bedside Manners", broadcast on 3 August 2013. Lily arrives at Holby City hospital to resume her second year of the Foundation Programme. Yu had previously appeared in the show as a separate guest character. She also decided to learn certain medical procedures to make her character believable. Lily is characterised as an ambitious junior doctor and intelligent high-achiever. Lily is good at her job but lacks any "bedside manner" and her no-nonsense attitude causes problems with colleagues and patients alike. The character was originally working towards a career in dermatology but becomes accustomed to the variety of work the Holby City's Emergency Department has to offer.

The character's storylines have focused on themes of bullying at different points of her tenure. Lily is subjected to harsh treatment from her mentor Consultant Martin Ashford (Patrick Robinson). She takes him to a tribunal from which she emerges victorious. Two years later the show switched the roles playing Lily as the bully when she is designated to mentor to junior doctor Alicia Munroe (Chelsea Halfpenny), who resigns from the hospital to escape Lily. The show have also centered a standalone episode around the character, which played her turning into a detective roll to solve two murders and endangering her life confronting the culprit. Yu decided to leave the serial in 2017 and Lily made her final appearance in the eleventh episode of series thirty-two, broadcast on 4 November 2017. The character has been generally well received by critics favouring her sound medical skills and poor bedside manner. But Duncan Lindsay writing for newspaper Metro accused the character of being one-dimensional.

== Development ==
=== Casting and characterisation ===
Lily was first introduced to viewers via the official Casualty website through a trailer. Three days later the BBC formally announced her casting and released a series of promotional pictures of Yu on-set and in character. She was billed as a junior doctor with a bad bedside manner who would annoy all of her colleagues. Yu had previously appeared in the show as a guest character Mingmei Ducheng for one episode in 2010. Of her casting Yu stated: "It’s such a privilege to be joining the cast of BBC One’s Casualty. [...] I am really enjoying all of the medical jargon and being taught the various techniques." Executive producer Oliver Kent said that Lily and fellow new character Rita Freeman (Chloe Howman) "hit the ground running and are set to create a stir in the ED". The character is introduced during the series twenty-eight episode "Bedside Manners", broadcast on 3 August 2013.

A&E is a pre-requisite for a junior doctor, but it is not part of Lily Chao’s long-term plan. She has her sights set on dermatology, a good match in marriage and a financially rewarding private-practice. An intelligent, logical, high-achiever, Lily finds the theory easy, but she continues to struggle with her bedside manner. Lily comes from a hard-working family who like to boast about their doctor daughter, but have never really told her they are proud of her.

— BBC Online.

Yu told Sarah Ellis of Inside Soap that her character speaks her mind without giving it any thought. She sometimes regrets her actions but would not admit that she is wrong. Lily believes that you can have anything in life providing you work hard for it. She is not bothered if she is not well-liked because she would rather spend her time learning new skills. Lily is not a character for the "easily offended" to be around. A BBC Online reporter described her as "technically brilliant and is definitely someone you’d want as your doctor". Lily behaves "defensive and guarded" and Yu believes that her past may have contributed to this. She said that there is more of Lily's life to discover because she is never shown "behind closed doors" in her home life.

In order to make Lily appear like a more realistic doctor Yu learned certain medical procedures. The actress can perform surgical sutures and later learned how to perform a chest drain. Yu has also admitted that she "begged" the producers to continue to give her character more "medical heavy storylines".

=== Early career ===
"I think it's so important to show female characters who are not just equal to men, but maybe even a little better in terms of their jobs and their status [...] to see a programme like Casualty showing women who are beautiful and sexy, but also clever and a little bit geeky as well, it's just a great thing."

— Yu on the importance of Casualty's strong female characters like Lily. (2014)

Lily begins doing her rounds on the Emergency Department ward and is mentored by Consultant Martin Ashford (Patrick Robinson). Lily spends her first shift trying to link up three unconnected patients' cases together, but her attitude causes an argument with Ash. A Casualty spokesperson told Ellis (Inside Soap) that Lily's attitude during her first day shows that she is not interested in making friends. When she accuses a patient of being unfaithful to their wife Ash cautions her. Lily is shocked and "genuinely can't understand what she's done wrong". They explained that the character believes that "the department needs to be organised better and thats not her problem." Her colleagues make a bet on how long she will last working in the ED wards. Ash invites Lily to accompany him on a life-saving mission. He jumps into a cold dock to save a drowning patient and Lily is in awe. She praises Ash for and reassures him after mistakenly perceiving him to have been hesitant to administer a life saving procedure. Ash is annoyed that a junior doctor would dare to appraise him and verbally abuses her in public. Lily is left "mortified" by Ash's treatment of her in front of her colleagues. A press officer for the show explained that "Lily has a lot to learn about the realities of working in an ED [... it highlights] Lily's total lack of experience in dealing with life-and-death situations in the process.

Her harsh bedside manner becomes a concern for Ash who decides to challenge her attitude. He takes action when she ignores his orders over a patient's care and tells her that a patient has died. Yu explained that Ash did so "in order to teach her a lesson". Lily accuses Ash of bullying her and makes a formal complaint which is taken seriously. Ash is forced to face a tribunal in front of the hospital board and CEO Guy Self (John Michie). Ash is reprimanded for pretending that a patient had died, given a written warning for unprofessional conduct but as What's on TV reported he "expresses genuine remorse for the heartache he caused his junior doctor." Following the decision Lily requests that she stays working in the ED department and in surprising scenes Ash voices his support for her to stay.

Ben Dowell from the Radio Times announced that Casualty were planning three special stand-alone episodes with dark themes. Accredited actor Gary Lucy had been cast as patient Valentine Kildare for the first episode which also had Lily as the centric character. The episode was billed as a "special murder mystery" story which sees Lily investigating murders. The episode was also set to an eerie tone with flickering lights and power cuts explained on-screen with electricity generator testing. The show's producer Erika Hossington said she wanted to create a "very ghostly place" and filming took place during a "tiring" night shoot. The storyline played out following the death of two patients under unexplained circumstances. Lily treats Valentine and suspects that he is a murderer.

Lily had treated the deceased patients and initially questioned her competence following their death. Yu told a What's on TV writer that "Lily puts on her detective hat, as she wants to know the truth." She described Valentine as "a strange man" so it makes a "frightening situation" for Lily. Lily ends up putting her life in danger when she confronts a corrupt police officer who is responsible for the murders. Yu described it as "an amazing scene" which was originally written for seven separate scenes until Yu requested it be merged into the single one eventually transmitted. The actress enjoyed the chance to get involved with the unravelling of a big storyline.

Lily focuses on her career and does not have time for relationships. She notices that a romance is developing between registrar Ethan Hardy (George Rainsford) and barista Honey Wright (Chelsee Healey). She decides to offer Honey advice to prevent them from getting together. Yu defended her character's actions believing that Lily does not understand "romantic love" and is unsure of how to deal with it. Yu added that "It’s interesting to see Lily’s reaction to Ethan and Honey’s romance. Time will tell if she’s jealous, supportive or even knows how she feels!" When Yu first joined the show she was made to believe that Lily and Ethan would start a relationship, but this never materialised. Producers felt that they did not have romantic chemistry because of the actor's off-set hysterics. Yu thought that Lily was better suited to Ethan's brother Caleb Knight (Richard Winsor) with whom she had once slept with. Yu labelled them "both fiercely independent creatures". However, Lily continues to pursue Ethan and uses "underhand tactics" to prevent Honey succeeding.

When the character was first introduced she only planned to work in the ED ward for a limited time. She had aspirations to work in dermatology at the end of a five-year-plan. But following eighteen months working at Holby City hospital she changed her career plans. Yu explained that "Lily’s grown up a lot this past year or so working in the hospital. Initially she wanted to leave and go on to dermatology, where she’d probably make a lot of money, but now I think she’d miss the adrenaline and variety of her ED job and saving lives!"

=== Bullying Alicia Munroe ===
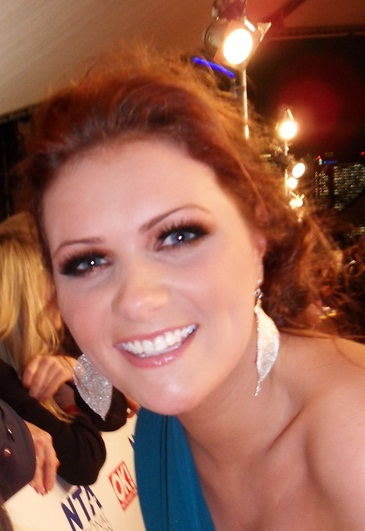
Chelsea Halfpenny plays Lily's junior doctor Alicia Munroe.

Lily is chosen to mentor new junior doctor Alicia Munroe (Chelsea Halfpenny), but Lily is not impressed with Alicia's popularity and sound medical skills. Halfpenny told Ellis that Lily is "an amazing doctor, but struggles to connect with people on a personal level, so I think she's threatened by somebody who can do both." Alicia tries to befriend Lily because she wants to create a fun working environment but her jokes are not well received by Lily. Halfpenny added that Alicia is just "desperate" to impress her mentor.

Lily continues to be critical and confrontational of Alicia whilst claiming only to be trying to attain better performance from her mentee. Alicia saves a patient's life in difficult circumstances outside of the hospital. But Lily dismisses her heroics and launches a verbal attack on Alicia in front of other Emergency Department staff. At the same time Lily had been dealing with the aftermath of her father's sudden death. Yu told Ellis that "[we explored] those extreme emotions without worrying about anything else. That scene in resus is an explosion of all the emotions Lily has been feeling - it's just a shame that Alicia is on the receiving end of it." Senior nurse Charlie Fairhead (Derek Thompson) witnesses Lily's behaviour and compares the situation to when Ash was bullying her. Yu believed that Lily felt remorse when she recalled how she had felt. But Lily realises that she has gone too far and "it gets to the point where she's way beyond saying sorry." Lily's treatment results in Alicia resigning from her position owing her decision to Lily bullying her. Yu hated being mean to Halfpenny during the filming of Lily and Alicia's clashes because they were friends off-screen.

Producer Hossington told Daniel Kilkelly from Digital Spy that Lily's behaviour was so extreme because she was grieving for her father. Lily also feared that her father died not being proud of her. Hossington added "in that time that she felt most vulnerable, she struggled with being faced with someone like Alicia who was so great at what she did." The show had planned the character's comeuppance when her colleagues turn against her. This gave writers the opportunity to explore Lily's character in more depth. She added that the audience could finally "see her vulnerability about letting her father down."

=== Departure ===
"Compare Lily to how she was when she first arrived − she was an idealistic doctor who didn't really care about anyone else, only her career. So for her to have fallen in love with Iain and yet walk away from it... [...] Lily's doing a very grown up thing!"

— Yu on Lily at the beginning and end of her time in the serial. (2017)

On 31 October 2017, it was confirmed that Yu had decided to leave her role and that her exit scenes would broadcast on 4 November. After being offered a year-long contract in January 2017, Yu declined and told producers she would be leaving, which they understood. She opted to leave to explore new roles and to return to London, her hometown. Yu felt her final episode was her "last chance to prove what [she] could do". She told Elaine Reilly of What's on TV that Matthew Evans, the episode's director, handled the episode with the "sensitivity and compassion" that she needed. Yu found her final week of filming challenging and commented, "I was trying to be strong and do the Lily Chao defence mechanism, but I was heartbroken." Producers did not kill the character off so she could return in the future.

Lily is offered a research position in Hong Kong, but is conflicted about taking it as she would have to end her relationship with paramedic Iain Dean (Michael Stevenson). Yu stated that if Lily was single, she would have "leapfrogged over her colleagues" to improve her career. She commented that for Lily, "leaving definitely isn't an easy decision". Lily struggles to end their relationship because she has developed strong feelings for Iain. Despite this, Lily feels that since the return of Iain's former partner Sam Nicholls (Charlotte Salt), she has become second best in his eyes. Lily decides to walk away from Iain rather than stay and have their relationship deteriorate. Yu stated that leaving Iain is incredibly challenging for Lily as she changed herself for him. When Iain tries to prove his love for Lily, he sings karaoke to her. Yu found this scene amusing and struggled to remain in character. As they share a final embrace, Lily reminds herself who she is and tries not to become emotional in front of Iain. Yu explained that Lily wanted to leave with "her head held high".

== Reception ==
David Brown (Radio Times) labelled her a "spiky new junior doctor" who is "focused and intellectually fierce ". Ellis of Inside Soap stated that "while we know that Dr Lily Chao's bedside manner leaves a lot to be desired, her treatment of colleague Alicia Munroe has been nothing short of brutal." Their colleague called her a "strait-laced doctor". Duncan Lindsay writing for newspaper Metro branded Lily "a competent doctor" but served better as a background character. He believed she was not a likeable enough character to have big storylines. He called her a "quite abrasive and spiky" character who is "largely one dimensional and pretty irritating". He also criticised the show for missing opportunities to add depth to the character. A What's on TV reporter branded her a "no-nonsense medic" character, another opined "Doctor Lily Chao is infamous for her cold, clinical demeanour." A writer for The Sentinel branded her "the somewhat brusque doctor Lily". They criticised her stating "The fresh-faced Lily had arrived at Holby believing she knew it all already. If she'd watched the previous 27 series, she'd know otherwise. One thing Lily should never go near is physiotherapy – she's far too adept at rubbing people up the wrong way." A reporter from the Coventry Telegraph branded her a "hard-working medic". Andrew Watt from the Northampton Herald & Post branded the character a "possible future Miss Marple".
