= Alicia Munroe =

Fictional character from the BBC medical drama Casualty

- Casualty character
- Chelsea Halfpenny as Alicia Munroe
- First appearance: "Cradle to Grave"; 19 September 2015
- Last appearance: Episode 1112; 19 January 2019
- Portrayed by: Chelsea Halfpenny
- Duration: 2015–2019

In-universe information
- Occupation: Specialty registrar, pediatric emergency medicine; (prev. Specialty registrar, emergency medicine; F2 doctor, emergency medicine)
- Significant others: Ethan Hardy; Caleb Knight
- Relatives: Jackie Munroe (mother); Howard Munroe (father)

Alicia Munroe is a fictional character from the BBC medical drama Casualty, played by Chelsea Halfpenny. She first appears in the series thirty episode "Cradle to Grave", broadcast on 19 September 2015. The character is introduced as an F2 doctor for a workplace bullying storyline with registrar Lily Chao (Crystal Yu), appearing for a stint of eight episodes. Alicia is characterised as bright, bubbly and a try-hard, making her appear naive. Despite this, Alicia is a brilliant doctor who always does more than is acceptable for her patients. Alicia's backstory states that she has grown up in Newcastle where she attended medical school, but recently moved to Holby.

Halfpenny reprised the role in August 2016 and the character was involved in a story about how separation affects adults. Alicia then became embroiled in a love triangle between brothers Caleb "Cal" Knight (Richard Winsor) and Ethan Hardy (George Rainsford), and a subsequent relationship with Ethan, which ends following Cal's death. Producers later involved Alicia in a two-part special set in France, followed by a focus on Alicia's career, which saw her become a specialty registrar in pediatric emergency medicine.

Alicia's development continues as she creates an anonymous blog criticising the ED's ongoing problems after becoming disillusioned with the NHS. Producers then explored the topic of rape and sexual consent in a new storyline arc for Alicia after she is raped by F1 doctor Eddie McAllister (Joe Gaminara). Halfpenny decided to leave the drama in 2018 and Alicia departs in the twenty episode of series thirty-three, broadcast on 19 January 2019. The character and her storylines have been well received by critics, with Elaine Reilly of What's on TV writing that she arrived in "a puff of pink hair and optimism".

== Casting ==
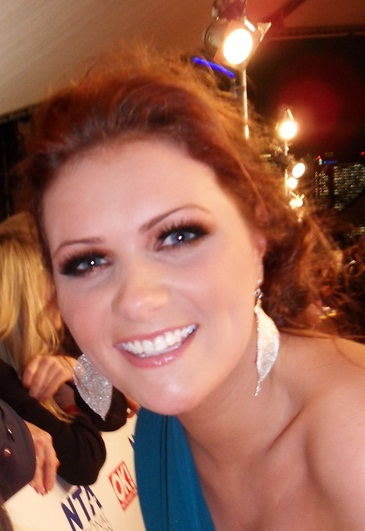
Chelsea Halfpenny was cast in the role of Alicia.

Alicia was previewed to viewers through a show trailer released on the show's official website on 15 July 2015. It featured a clip of Halfpenny wearing doctor's scrubs. Halfpenny confirmed her casting in August 2015 via Twitter, expressing her delight at joining the series. She revealed her first episode would air on 19 September 2015.

Halfpenny had previously appeared on the show as a patient, Karine, in the series eighteen episode "What Parents Do". Derek Thompson, who plays Charlie Fairhead, remembered Halfpenny from her guest appearance because of her "unusual" surname. Halfpenny recalled her guest appearance and praised the cast then and upon her return. She added that she found it easy to make friends within the cast. The character was introduced during the series thirty episode "Cradle to Grave", broadcast on 19 September 2015.

Halfpenny had two auditions for the character and believed that because producers had an idea about the character, she did not have to attend several auditions. She auditioned for the show's casting director in her first audition. Halfpenny described her second audition as "overwhelming" and "so stressful". In her section audition, she screen-tested with Crystal Yu (who portrays Lily) and performed an operation on a mannequin which she said was hard. Halfpenny struggled with the 'operation' and was "squeamish" so the medical advisor and Yu assisted her. Halfpenny struggled to pronounce the medical terminology and was nervous when she had a single line in a scene in case she forgot it. Halfpenny also had to learn how to stitch for the role.

In 2016, Halfpenny shadowed an A&E doctor which she described as "really interesting." She hoped that shadowing a doctor would allow her to make her acting appear more "realistic" and said she was "more confident with things like CPR", but would not be able to perform it in real life.

== Development ==
=== Characterisation and introduction ===
She’s a party girl, she works hard but plays harder, she’s a fun loving, free spirited flirt with a love ‘em and leave ‘em attitude but secretly fears ending up alone. Alicia has always been really close to her family and a real daddy’s girl, one of the reasons why she stayed in Newcastle to study. Her family have since moved to Holby. Alicia’s working in medicine because she desperately wants to make a difference, she finds the ED thrilling. She’s completely caring and will always go the extra mile to give her patients the treatment they deserve.

— BBC Online.

Alicia is billed as "bright and bubbly" and Halfpenny said that "she's got blonde and pink hair, so people expect her to be a bit ditzy, but she's not." She called Alicia "a bit of a try-hard" because she tries to impress everyone, making her appear naive. She added that Alicia was "a young and kind person". Alicia is a "typical junior doctor" and very talented at her job which shows when she starts working. A BBC Online reporter described her as "effortlessly brilliant and passionate about her chosen subject – medicine". She is a positive person and "a joy to have in the department". Halfpenny was highly publicised for playing Amy Wyatt in the British soap opera Emmerdale, and she contrasted Alicia's characteristics with that of Amy, stating that whilst Amy "lied quite a lot", Alicia is "very happy-go-lucky". She said she also preferred smiling to being miserable, which Amy was known for being. Halfpenny reflected on Alicia's characterisation in 2018, noting that Alicia joined the show as "a naïve girl" who struggled with serious injuries and found herself getting over involved in patients' lives, but over the course of her time on drama, Alicia has become more "professional".

Alicia's backstory states that she had recently graduated from medical school, which not only made her a brilliant doctor, but also a "genuinely nice person to be around." In an interview with Olivia Heath (Reveal), Halfpenny described Alicia as a "clever girl" and "a quick learner" who does not appreciate how hard working in the ED is, but despite that is professional. On-screen, the character Connie Beauchamp (portrayed by Amanda Mealing) described Alicia as "a breath of fresh air". Her positive nature can also cause her to be portrayed as annoying. Alicia's popularity among her colleagues irritated Lily Chao (Crystal Yu), who struggled to connect with them personally. In addition to this, Alicia tried to "have a laugh" with Lily, who had "none of it". Halfpenny opined that because Alicia is kind, she wanted to give Lily a hug and "understand" her.

Halfpenny described Alicia's first shift as "hell on earth" and revealed that Alicia would impress her colleagues, apart from Lily, when she spots a vulnerable patient. Halfpenny hoped fans would like Alicia, but worried that they may be annoyed by her cheerfulness. Halfpenny did not watch any of her scenes before they aired and said that she was "nervous" about watching her first scenes. Of her introduction, Halfpenny said that she was "enjoying this new chapter" of her career.

=== Workplace bullying and departure ===
"It’s more the personable side of Alicia’s personality that Lily just can’t cope with. She can’t comprehend that Alicia can both work efficiently, and make time to have relationships with the patients. Lily’s way more advanced as a doctor than Alicia, but she’s distracted with her personal life at the minute."

— Chelsea Halfpenny on why Alicia faced constant criticism from Lily. (2015)

Halfpenny's initial stint on the show revolved around a storyline which saw her bullied by her mentor Lily. Lily disliked Alicia's popularity and sound medical skills and Halfpenny believed that Lily was "threatened" by someone with both those skills. She began to resent Alicia and started expressing her resentment of her in front of their colleagues. Yu described Lily's actions as bullying, but believed that she bullied her because she was grieving for her father. Lily did not realise that she was bullying Alicia and Yu explained that "Lily says things in the heat of the moment and then regrets them, but she’s too proud to own up or say sorry to Alicia."

Alicia coped well with Lily's treatment of her for several weeks and Halfpenny explained that Alicia has an "outlook on life where she doesn’t take everything to heart", which meant she felt "quite bad for Lily about her father’s death" and wanted to be her friend. When Lily's attitude worsens, Alicia starts to realise how bad their situation is. Halfpenny believed that Alicia's vulnerability made her "even more of a target" for Lily. Alison Graham of Radio Times and Elaine Reilly of What's on TV both believed Lily was "jealous" of Alicia, with Reilly also describing Lily's constant criticism as a "sustained bullying campaign" against Alicia.

Halfpenny was only signed to appear in eight episodes and departed in the series 30 episode, "Avoidable Harm", broadcast on 14 November 2015. The episode was centric to Alicia and Halfpenny voiceovered the episode. She described it as "high drama" where viewers discover more about Alicia. Halfpenny described it as "the most challenging couple of weeks" of her career because she "had so much to do". The show's executive producer, Oliver Kent, teased the episode before its airing, promising "a huge crisis of conscience" for the character which would make her question "her faith in her career." The episode left Alicia's future "open ended" and Halfpenny speculated whether Lily's constant criticism caused her to end her career as a doctor. Halfpenny described Alicia's departure as "sad", while Reilly described Alicia's final shift as "harrowing".

In the episode, a child in Alicia's care goes missing, but in her search for the child, she is forced to treat a seriously injured man, who is being followed by his partner's violent father, in the back of a van. Halfpenny explained that Alicia realises "the true depths of the job" when in the van. Alicia saves the man's life and when the father gives up, he accidentally runs down his daughter and despite Alicia's best efforts to save her back in the department, she dies. Lily publicly berates Alicia in the department's reception, taking her bullying to a new level. Yu described the scene as "an explosion of all the emotions Lily has been feeling", adding it was "a shame that Alicia is on the receiving end of it!" Alicia struggles to cope with her emotions and Halfpenny said Alicia questioned whether she was "strong enough" to be a doctor. Alicia decided to quit her job at the hospital following Lily's bullying and Halfpenny described her decision as "impulsive". She said that Alicia was under pressure and felt "lonely" because she was lacking support from Lily.

Following Alicia's resignation, Lily's colleagues accused her of bullying Alicia, making her briefly feel guilty. Yu explained that Lily felt guilty, but believed that because of her bad experience being mentored by Martin Ashford (Patrick Robinson), Alicia should receive the same treatment from her. Lily realises that she has made a mistake in her actions towards Alicia, but it is too late and it "gets to the point where she's way beyond saying sorry". Yu disliked filming scenes where she was mean to Halfpenny as they were friends off-screen.

Reflecting on the role, Halfpenny said that the episodes were "really nice" for her and that she "really enjoyed it" and had "a great time", describing it as "action-packed". Her role in Casualty had reminded her why she had left Emmerdale, because she had "wanted to do other things".

=== Reintroduction ===
Following her departure in 2015, Halfpenny teased a possible return for her character. In November 2015, the show's series producer Erika Hossington suggested that Alicia's departure was "an 'au revoir' and not a goodbye", teasing that the character should face Lily. Halfpenny later expressed her desire to return to the show as a regular cast member. She told Soaplife that she enjoyed her time on the show and wished it had been more permanent.

The show's Summer 2016 trailer featured a clip of Halfpenny, with Radio Times confirming that she had returned to the role of Alicia. Oliver Kent confirmed that Alicia would be returning to the show, with TV Times magazine predicting that Alicia's return would be "bound to cause a stir". Halfpenny promised "interesting storylines" for Alicia. Alicia returns as a locum doctor, following her parents' divorce, which would delight Ethan Hardy (George Rainsford) and Louise Tyler (Azuka Oforka). Alicia tries to avoid Lily, but realises she is not as nasty as before and decides to stay at the hospital. Sophie Dainty of Digital Spy described the announcement as "good news for Casualty fans".

=== Introduction of parents ===
Alicia's parents, Jackie Munroe (Tracey Wilkinson) and Howard Munroe (James Gaddas), were introduced in September 2016, having previously been mentioned on-screen. Jackie was admitted as a patient under Ethan's care and Jackie tries to set Alicia on a date with Ethan. Alicia is left with "the biggest shock of all" when Ethan reveals Jackie is diagnosed with gonorrhea. Alicia believed Jackie had had an affair, but she was devastated when Howard revealed he was having an affair and is leaving Jackie "for good".

The characters were reintroduced in January 2017 for an episode which explored Alicia's backstory. Halfpenny described the episode as "really exciting" and said it would "delve deeper into family issues". She added that it was "great to have an episode that revolves around the personal life of your character" and the episode featured "the effect their marriage split has had on her." Off-screen, Alicia's parents had reconciled, which Alicia disagreed with. In the episode, Howard was revealed to have had an affair with another man, leaving Alicia and Jackie devastated.

In a 2017 interview with Digital Spy, Hossington discussed Alicia's upbringing, noting that "Alicia came from a very strong family" where she was content and unsuspecting, with her parents separating after she became an adult. She added that the show wanted to explore "what impact that has on you when you are grown up." Halfpenny explained Alicia's family "have fallen apart" which has "made Alicia rethink what she believes love to be" and lose faith in relationships. Hossington supported this view and revealed Alicia "becomes very distrustful of men".

=== Ethan Hardy and Cal Knight ===
During her original stint, Halfpenny revealed that her character would not have a love interest, but suggested a love triangle between Alicia, Ethan and his brother, registrar Caleb "Cal" Knight (Richard Winsor). In July 2016, Winsor revealed to Duncan Lindsay (Metro) that Ethan and Cal would "end up competing" for the attention of an unnamed woman. He added that there would be "sparring between them, and few misunderstandings". Producers teased a possible romance for Alicia and Ethan when they became trapped together on two occasions. They became trapped in a sinkhole together and when Alicia began having a panic attack, Ethan comforted her. As they were rescued, Alicia tried to kiss him. Lindsay predicted "complications" in their relationship and teased that Cal "may develop a soft spot" for Alicia. He ran a poll asking readers for their opinion on who the character should date: 91% of people who answered said Ethan, while the other 9% opined Cal as the ideal partner for Alicia. A show trailer confirmed a love triangle between the characters.

"She feels relief that one of them has finally said how they actually feel, because they've spent the past few months just tiptoeing around each other. But she also feels extreme guilt because she's going out with his brother − so Ethan is probably the worst person she could have cheated with!"

— Chelsea Halfpenny on Alicia's feelings after cheating on Cal with Ethan. (2017)

When Ethan failed to ask Alicia out, she began a relationship with Cal. Halfpenny explained that Alicia "looked to Cal for comfort and thought of him as a kindred spirit", despite knowing she should be with Ethan. She believed that Alicia "made the wrong choice at a time when she was feeling vulnerable." After a date ended because of his feelings for Alicia, Ethan confessed his feelings for her. They had sex, which she "really [tries] to forget about it". Alicia chose to end her relationship with Cal and commit to Ethan, however, she had second thoughts and decided not to damage the brothers' relationship. Halfpenny believed that Alicia chose to stay with Cal because it was "the easiest option for herself" as she has developed feelings for Cal as well. Producers plotted a twist where Cal discovers someone else's cuff-link on her bedroom floor, taking the decision out of her hands. Halfpenny said that Alicia was shocked by Cal's discovery because she was not "expecting to get caught" and he "catches her off guard".

Halfpenny believed that Alicia knew Ethan was the best partner for her because of the character's home life and previous relationships, but opined that Alicia should "go with her heart" and not "the easy option." The three co-stars got along well with each other and had "a real laugh together" on set. They often find it "really hard" to not corpse. Hossington explained that Alicia's distrust in men first occurred as she met Ethan, "the most perfect man she could ever meet". She added that the "emotional turmoil" she is experiencing, as a result of her parents' separation, has left her "stuck" between two "incredibly close" brothers. In January 2017, Halfpenny revealed that the storyline had not been resolved in scenes the show was currently filming, which was five months ahead of transmission and quipped that "Nothing’s ever simple in Holby!" Hossington said the story would "carry on running" into spring 2017.

Cal kept the cufflink and did not tell Alicia about his discovery. He continued to suspect Alicia of having an affair, which she was unaware of. Halfpenny explained that because Cal is "not usually that kind of person", Alicia does not suspect anything. Writers featured scenes of Cal's paranoia instead of scenes featuring the couple together and Halfpenny noted that Cal is not often seen in this respect so it is "fun to watch him squirm on screen for once". Cal finds Alicia's second phone in her locker and believes she "is having a separate life with someone else." Halfpenny said that "Cal’s fears are confirmed in that moment" and he lashes out. She added that Ethan is the "last person" who Cal would suspect and he would be "wounded", "completely surprised and massively hurt" by the news.

When Cal eventually discovers the truth, he kisses another woman. Ethan later requests Cal's permission to date Alicia, which he grants. While they are on their date, Cal is murdered, leaving Ethan and Alicia devastated. Rainsford commented, "It's typical that after a year of ups and downs and procrastinating, they got together on the day that Cal is murdered". In the aftermath of his death, Alicia and Ethan grow close and she comforts him. Rainsford explained that despite Ethan needing Alicia's support, it will be "difficult" for them. Ethan struggles with Cal's death and seeks revenge for his murder, adding strain to his relationship with Alicia. Halfpenny explained that while Alicia has feelings for Ethan, his revenge meant their relationship faltered. She hoped that the couple would reunite, but realised that the timing was not ideal. Rainsford confirmed that Alicia and Ethan's relationship has been "parked for now". In a September 2017 interview with Dainty (Digital Spy), producer Lucy Raffety called Alicia and Ethan "the lovely, glowy heart of the show" and expressed hope that the couple would reunite. She stated that within their relationship, they have a close friendship, which would be revisited and challenged. Rainsford reiterated this and confirmed that there was "discussions" to reunite the couple.

=== Volunteering and career progression ===
The serial announced plans to begin their thirty-second series with a two-part special set in Northern France on 30 July 2017. The special, which was filmed in Fishguard and Cardiff, follows Alicia, Louise Tyler (Aforka), Dylan Keogh (William Beck) and David Hide (Jason Durr) as they travel to France to offer their medical services at a refugee camp. After discovering that Cal had an interest in the project, Alicia and Louise decide to volunteer at the refugee camp as a legacy to him. On the journey to the camp, Alicia witnesses refugees attempting to flee their country and seriously injuring themselves in the process. Halfpenny explained that since the hospital environment is still "nerve-wracking" for Alicia, she is left "in pure shock" by the events in France. She added that when Alicia arrives, she goes "straight into doctor mode" and tries to commit to the job. The actress said the events portrayed in the episode are based on real-life situations which producers observed as research for the special.

While in France, Alicia meets "young and good-looking" volunteer doctor Cameron Hamilton (Cian Barry), who has volunteered at the camp for a while. Alicia finds Cameron attractive and uses him as "light relief" for the situation surrounding her. Halfpenny explained that Alicia becomes "distracted" by Cameron and attempts to impress him, which does not happen. Halfpenny liked the special as she felt it build awareness on the issues tackled. She also enjoyed working away from the show's studio and likened it to filming a small film. Following her experience volunteering at the refugee camp, Alicia "develops more of a backbone" and decides to focus on her career. Halfpenny found Alicia's decision "really exciting" because she enjoys the challenge associated with the medical scenes. Alicia also decides to stop drinking and to not have any relationships so she can focus on her career. Halfpenny explained that since focusing on her career, Alicia has taken her job "more seriously" and as a result, she has been promoted to a specialty registrar and passed her exams. While she liked Alicia's promotion, Halfpenny also found it challenging to portray the medic who may often lead Resus. F1 doctors Rash Masum (Neet Mohan) and Bea Kinsella (Michelle Fox) join the drama in series 32. Alicia begins mentoring Rash and Bea; Halfpenny found it surreal that Alicia was mentoring two junior doctors as she was being mentored by Lily only recently. Raffety confirmed that Alicia and Bea would develop a friendship. Halfpenny found Alicia and Bea's friendship enjoyable to film.

=== Anonymous blog ===
On Bea's first day in the ED, the department faces a crisis, which Alicia and other staff struggle to control. Alicia is assigned to be Bea's mentor. Reilly (What's on TV) revealed that Alicia would face the consequences of Bea's actions after her behaviour becomes unacceptable. During the day, Alicia treats Kam Kainth (Gary Wood) in an ambulance due to a lack of space in the ED. Not being treated in the ED results in Kam being admitted to the Intensive Treatment Unit. On Alicia's feelings towards this, Halfpenny said, "That was the straw that broke the camel's back because Alicia knew it was avoidable." She told Sarah Ellis of Inside Soap that she liked that Casualty could display what happens in British hospitals. When Halfpenny read the episode's script, she noticed something different about it in comparison to other episodes. She found this was more prominent when filming the episode. For the ED to appear busier, Fiona Walton, the episode's director, included more background artists in the scene. Halfpenny felt that the set was smaller with additional people on-set, but found the experience "fun" and commented, "It keeps you on your toes!" Walton wanted to accurately portray the NHS, which Halfpenny thought was "really important".

"Alicia never intended to personally attack Ethan. They're friends and she wants to be there for him. She truly believes Ethan doing the best job he can; yet at the back of her mind she knows she's causing him more stress!"

— Chelsea Halfpenny on Alicia's feelings for Ethan after creating the blog. (2017)

Disillusioned with the NHS, Alicia creates an anonymous blog called "Rage in Resus", which outlines the struggles that the emergency department are facing. Halfpenny explained that Alicia finds the blog "important" and believes it is about more than the ED; it is about the NHS. The blog receives a lot of attention from hospital staff and the public, while also upsetting some people. Halfpenny stated that this was never Alicia's goal when she created the blog. As the acting clinical lead of the ED, Ethan is pressurised from his superiors to find out the bloggers' identity. The pressure becomes too much for Ethan and he confides in Alicia about the situation, making Alicia feel guilty about her role in the situation. While comforting him, Alicia and Ethan kiss. Halfpenny said that Alicia believes that Ethan will never know that she is the creator of the blog. The actress hoped that fans of the couple would be pleased by their reconciliation, although she admitted that the weather was cold and windy when they filmed the scenes, which she disliked. After Alicia and Ethan have sex, she hopes that he will share details about the management of the ED with her. Alicia is "fuming" when Ethan warns her that at work, he is her boss and she is under his instruction.

When Jac Naylor (Rosie Marcel) warns Ethan to find the owner of the blog, Alicia begins to struggle with the pressure of maintaining her secret. Ethan reaches "the end of his teather" while trying to find the blog owner and accuses Alicia of being responsible. Halfpenny explained that Alicia did not think that Ethan would accuse her due to their close relationship. She stated that Alicia becomes "more and more panicked" by the popularity of the blog, although she believes that the blog is directed at the ED and its leadership rather than Ethan himself. Alicia denies being responsible for the blog; on Alicia's decision to confess, Halfpenny commented, "It's not the right time for her to confess, because she's doing this blog to make a difference — she's doing it to help people." She also felt that Ethan would be upset when he discovered that Alicia had lied to him. Rash becomes prepared to take the blame for the blog, which makes Alicia question her behaviour. The anonymous blog storyline also helps to progress Ethan and Alicia's relationship, although Halfpenny observed that "something always gets in the way" of their relationship. The actress thought that the audience would not like the couple together after the storyline.

=== Rape ===
"The storyline not only dramatises the devastating effect on Alicia, but also does not shy away from thorny and complex questions about the nature of consent and perception in a way that may well divide the audience."

— Executive producer Simon Harper on Alicia's rape. (2018)

The show's spring trailer, released on 16 March 2018, features Alicia looking upset and burning her clothes and collapsing. Dainty (Digital Spy) confirmed that Alicia would be involved in a new storyline and thought that she could face "a harrowing ordeal". She questioned whether Alicia would be attacked, become ill or become pregnant, and wondered whether new F1 doctor Eddie McAllister (Joe Gaminara) would be involved in the storyline. On 9 May 2018, it was announced that Alicia's new storyline would see her raped by Eddie. The storyline begins in May and continues for six weeks as Alicia struggles with the attack and its aftermath. Alicia experiences flashbacks of a night of drinking with her colleagues, which help her realise that Eddie has raped her. The storyline had previously been teased by producer Lucy Raffety in an interview with Digital Spy. She dubbed the story "a huge, topical story that could divide the nation". She revealed that the storyline had divided the opinions of the cast and crew and said that the story is contentious and would be "very different in feel". Rafferty confirmed that Alicia's rape would culminate in the series 32 finale, which would be written by Barbara Machin.

Producers spoke with Rape Crisis England and Wales about the storyline and sought their guidance before developing the scripts for the episodes. Halfpenny felt "a distinct sense of responsibility" to portray the storyline accurately and thought it was crucial to use Casualty to highlight the issue. She concluded that the drama had portrayed the plot "authentically and respectively" and hoped that it helped some people. Katie Russell, a spokesperson for Rape Crisis, said that Casualty is trying to highlight important societal issues and avoiding the stigma that rape is a taboo subject. She explained that Alicia's storyline explores the issue of consent "responsibly and carefully" and hoped that it could raise awareness for the issue. Simon Harper, the show's executive producer, thought it was important to portray a "tough, contemporary" storyline. He praised the show's work on the story and commended Halfpenny for her "stunning, heart breaking performance". He also thanked Rape Crisis for their assistance with the plot.

=== Departure ===
Alicia departed during the thirty-third series on 19 January 2019. Connie informs Alicia that she has been put forward for a paediatric job away from Holby. Halfpenny described the offer as "an amazing opportunity" for Alicia. After accepting the job, Alicia then receives a marriage proposal from Ethan, which leads her to question whether she wants to stay for "the comfort of Ethan and doing the job she knows and loves". Halfpenny explained that she told the show's producer Lucy Raffety about her decision to leave Casualty as she was due to film Alicia's rape storyline. They decided that Alicia would not leave straight after that story had concluded, as they did not want it to look like she was running away. Instead, viewers saw Alicia becoming happy again and returning to her old self. Halfpenny said filming her last episode was very emotional and she had to stop filming at one point as it was "too traumatic."

== Reception ==
For her portrayal of Alicia, Halfpenny won the Best Drama Star accolade at the 2018 Inside Soap Awards. At the same ceremony, Alicia's rape plot received a nomination for Best Drama Storyline. Later that year, Halfpenny was nominated for Best Soap Actor (Female) at the Digital Spy Reader Awards; she came in ninth place with 4% of the total vote. The rape storyline was also nominated in the Best Soap Storyline category; it came in tenth place with 3.9% of the total vote.

Alison Graham (Radio Times) labelled Alicia as "a dip-dyed flopsy" and "a cheerful Geordie with an almost supernatural ability to discover the secrets of others, just by looking at them." Her colleague, David Brown, described Alicia as "very upbeat and enthusiastic". Daniel Kilkelly of Digital Spy observed that Alicia's original stint had "a great response". Producer Hossington said that she "loved" the character. While reviewing Alicia's first episode, a contributor to The Sunday People stated that she "shows an admirable bedside manner".

Elaine Reilly (What's on TV) said that Alicia arrived "in a puff of pink hair and optimism". Reilly opined that the workplace bullying storyline made Alicia and Lily "sympathetic characters". Ellis (Inside Soap) described the storyline as "brutal". TV3 described Alicia's departure as "emotional". Graham said the episode was "charged, tragic and rather good", adding that Halfpenny's voiceover was "unnerving". A reporter from the Liverpool Echo included Alicia's departure in a television highlights of the week feature. They said that in the workplace bullying storyline, Alicia was in a position where she has "a boss [she] simply can't please, no matter how hard [she tries]".

A reporter from Inside Soap noted that it was obvious that Ethan and Alicia were "secretly carrying a torch for one another". Halfpenny received many tweets from fans of the show, telling her "to stop messing them [Ethan and Cal] both around". She added that fans backed the coupling of Alicia and Ethan and were "so relieved when they finally kissed". She later said that she receives tweets telling her "she's ruining the brothers’ relationship" and said that fans were "worried" since they enjoy Ethan and Cal's pairing. In March 2018, Halfpenny told Ellis of Inside Soap that fans of the show liked the pairing of Alicia and Ethan, which she thought was because they enjoyed seeing the relationship "blossom" from a friendship. On the anonymous blog storyline, Ellis observed, "Tongues have been wagging in Holby City ED over the past few weeks, as everyone tries to work out who's behind the explosive Rage in Resus blog that's been publicly blasting the department." Employees of the NHS liked the storyline as they felt they could relate with it, while Halfpenny was told it "realistically" reflected the conditions of the NHS. Reilly of What's on TV described the anonymous blog plot as "explosive" and said that Casualty developed "a realistic atmosphere on set".
