= Rita Freeman =

Fictional character from the BBC medical drama Casualty

- Casualty character
- Chloe Howman as Rita Freeman
- First appearance: "Once There Was a Way Home – Part One"; 10 August 2013
- Last appearance: "The Fear"; 16 July 2016
- Portrayed by: Chloe Howman
- Spinoff(s): "Mrs Walker-To-Be" (2015)
- Duration: 2013–2016

In-universe information
- Occupation: Sister, Clinical nurse manager; (prev. staff nurse, senior staff nurse)
- Spouse: Mark Richie (2005–2014)
- Significant other: Iain Dean

Rita Freeman is a fictional character from the BBC medical drama Casualty, played by Chloe Howman. She first appears in the twenty-eighth series episode "Once There Was a Way Home – Part One", first broadcast on 10 August 2013. Howman's casting was announced four days before her debut. She attended multiple auditions against other actresses for the role. Rita is introduced as a new staff nurse at Holby City Hospital's emergency department (ED). She is characterised as fun, feisty, blunt and excellent at her job, which means patients are at ease around her. Howman compared the character to a Jack Russell Terrier. Despite being a popular member of staff, Rita struggles to make personal relationships. Rita's first episode features an incident at her flat when her ceiling caves in; Howman liked the introduction and found it dramatic. Throughout her tenure on the show, Rita has been promoted twice: on first instance to senior staff nurse and on second instance to clinical nurse manager.

The character's stories have mainly revolved around the exploration of her backstory. Joel Beckett was cast as Rita's estranged husband Mark Richie, who is a convicted child abuser. He is introduced a year after Rita's arrival when she files for divorce and he is admitted to the ED. Mark's appearance has a detrimental effect on Rita's mental wellbeing and she begins heavily drinking, sometimes during shifts. Producers reintroduced the character on two further occasions to challenge Rita and develop her other stories. On one occasion, Mark's appearance coincides with the disappearance of a child and on another occasion, he is admitted to the ED with the girl he abused, bringing a conclusion to the exploration of Rita's backstory.

Producers also establish a feud between Rita and lead ED consultant Connie Beauchamp (Amanda Mealing) following Mark's first return. Connie blames Rita for her daughter leaving and when Connie is arrested, Rita hides evidence proving her not guilty. The story ends when the truth emerges. Show bosses then romantically paired Rita with paramedic Iain Dean (Michael Stevenson) for lighter stories. Writers intertwined Mark's second return with the story to make it darker and Rita lies about being attacked by Mark. The story marks the character's exit in the thirtieth series episode "The Fear", first broadcast on 16 July 2016. Rita has been generally well received by critics who liked her strong and feisty personality. However, Radio Times critic Alison Graham branded the character "Mother Teresa in trainers" and "a frowning, joyless nun" following her darker stories.

== Casting ==
On 30 July 2013, it was announced that actress Chloe Howman had been cast as nurse Rita Freeman and would debut in series 28. Rita's introduction was then previewed in a trailer released on the official Casualty website on 3 August 2013. Howman did not struggle to settle into the cast as they were "warm and welcoming" towards her. Howman attended multiple auditions for the role and producers saw several actresses for the role. In one audition, Howman performed a screen test with Casualty cast members Patrick Robinson (Martin "Ash" Ashford) and Jane Hazlegrove (Kathleen "Dixie" Dixon), before being told she had won the role of Rita. For the role of Rita, Howman dyed her hair from brown to blonde, which encouraged the actress to change her wardrobe.

== Development ==
=== Characterisation and career ===
Rita's a whirlwind of energy and enthusiasm, and runs the nursing team with brilliant efficiency. She's a firm and decisive leader, who likes to get stuck into any challenge that comes her way. She's an excellent nurse who doesn't put up with any nonsense – junior doctors have been known to shake in her wake and patients do exactly as they're told.

— An excerpt from Rita's profile on the official Casualty website.

Rita is introduced as a staff nurse in Holby City Hospital's emergency department (ED). Howman described the character as sympathetic, good with patients, fiery, candid and fun to be around. The actress added, "Rita is good at her job as she's efficient in the workplace and doesn't suffer fools gladly!" Rita is sociable, flirtatious, a good listener and good at giving advice, which means that patients do not struggle when confiding in her. A BBC Online reporter said that Rita is "exactly the person you would want next to you in a crisis". However, Rita also lacks in self confidence and does not make personal relationships with others at risk of being hurt. She is a strong character and holds the opinion that "what doesn't kill us makes us stronger".

Howman explained that while Rita is direct, she is not horrible and manipulative and is still popular amongst her colleagues. She said that Rita is good at communicating, commenting, "She's very good at voicing what needs to be voiced!" Howman later described Rita as a "humanitarian". The actress thought that she shared similar personality traits to her character, explaining that Rita is "feisty and tactile with a passion for truth", a trait they share. She compared the character to a Jack Russell Terrier due to her "terrier-like" status, explaining that she is resilient and courageous. Howman told Tricia Welch of the Daily Express that Rita is a true-hearted and caring person. The costume department style Rita in a leather jacket and jeans, which Howman thought the character is suited to as she is "boyish".

When the vacany arises, Rita secures a job as a senior staff nurse. In January 2015, Rita is appointed the ED's clinical nurse manager. Howman said that Rita's managerial style with the nursing staff would be different from how clinical lead Connie Beauchamp (Amanda Mealing) manages the doctors. She explained that Rita does not follow the idea of "hierarchy" and prefers to work as a team rather than giving orders. The actress added that Rita's new position makes her understand the pressure of Connie's job. Rita has a different uniform for her new job, which Howman found exciting. She liked the dark blue colour and described it as "complimentary".

=== Introduction ===
Rita is introduced in the series 28 episode "Once There Was a Way Home – Part One", first broadcast on 10 August 2013. As Rita prepares to leave for her first shift, the ceiling of her apartment collapses. She goes to find out what happened and learns that her neighbour Jane's hoarding has caused the collapse. Rita notices that Jane is trapped and assists the paramedics in helping her out. Jane begs with the hospital staff not to inform her father of the accident, creating a clash between Rita and the senior staff nurse, Adrian "Fletch" Fletcher (Alex Walkinshaw), who disagrees with Rita's view. Howman billed the introduction as "very dramatic" and "very exciting". On the introduction, the actress commented, "I couldn't have asked for a better way to join the show." She revealed that she watched her first episode with her family as she felt that it was vital that she watched Rita's journey.

Rita later works a shift with the paramedic team, Dixie and Jeff Collier (Matt Bardock), to experience their view of life. She struggles with the experience and cannot detach herself from a patient who refuses treatment after taking a heroin overdose. The trio later attend to a man stuck in machinery at a junkyard, who Rita connects with and chats to as they wait for the fire crew. However, in a "heartbreaking" twist, Rita is told that the man will die when he is released.

=== Exploration of backstory ===
==== Mark's introduction ====
At the time of Rita's introduction, Howman confirmed that the character has a backstory, which would be explored. She teased, "life hasn't been particularly easy for Rita". When asked by colleagues about her personal life, Rita claims that she is a widow. However, Rita is actually estranged from her husband, Mark Richie (Joel Beckett), who is alive. Howman clarified that her character did not mean to lie about her marriage, but once she said it, she felt that she could not change her story. The actress likened Rita to "a rabbit in the headlights" when she is asked about her husband, and pointed out that Rita is in "a cornered moment" when she says Mark is dead.

Mark is a former teacher who was convicted of child abuse after having a relationship with a thirteen-year-old girl. Mark denied the allegations and Rita believed him, defending him at his trial. Howman explained that Rita believed Mark because she "loved him, trusted him and genuinely believed him". Rita realised the truth when Mark was found guilty. She felt ashamed by her actions and changed jobs as she did not want anyone to find out about her past. Rita lies about Mark because they have not spoken since his imprisonment. Howman carried out research for the storyline and spoke to somebody who went through a similar experience to Rita. She also expressed her compassion for anyone in a similar situation with the character.

Mark is introduced to the series in August 2014 shortly after Rita files for divorce. Mark orders an attack on himself in prison so he can be admitted to the ED to see Rita. Howman told Elaine Reilly of What's on TV that Rita wanted to start afresh, but Mark's arrival has disrupted that. Mark then refuses any treatment until he can speak with Rita, although she refuses to speak to him. Howman thought the situation is "horrible" because Mark is bleeding and won't let anyone treat him. Rita wants to have Mark treated fast and leaving soon, so she decides to speak with him. Howman wanted it to be clear that Rita still loves Mark, which she called "the fundamental flaw in the situation". She explained that Mark can still "manipulate" Rita and added, "Rita's life unravels before her! It's a devastating story. Rita's shame is intense."

Rita and Mark have an emotional discussion, which Howman enjoyed acting out with Beckett. The actress liked exploring the character of Rita as Casualty usually follows the stories of its guest characters. Rita hopes to stop her colleagues from discovering Mark's identity so steals his patient files, an act which could end Rita's career. Howman called it "a big slur on her". When her colleagues discover that Mark is alive, they are upset with Rita. Howman told Sarah Ellis of Inside Soap that some of Rita's colleagues feel "hurt" by the revelation because everything that Rita had told them has become "this massive lie". The actress described the day as "the worst possible day" for Rita.

==== Aftermath of Mark's appearance ====
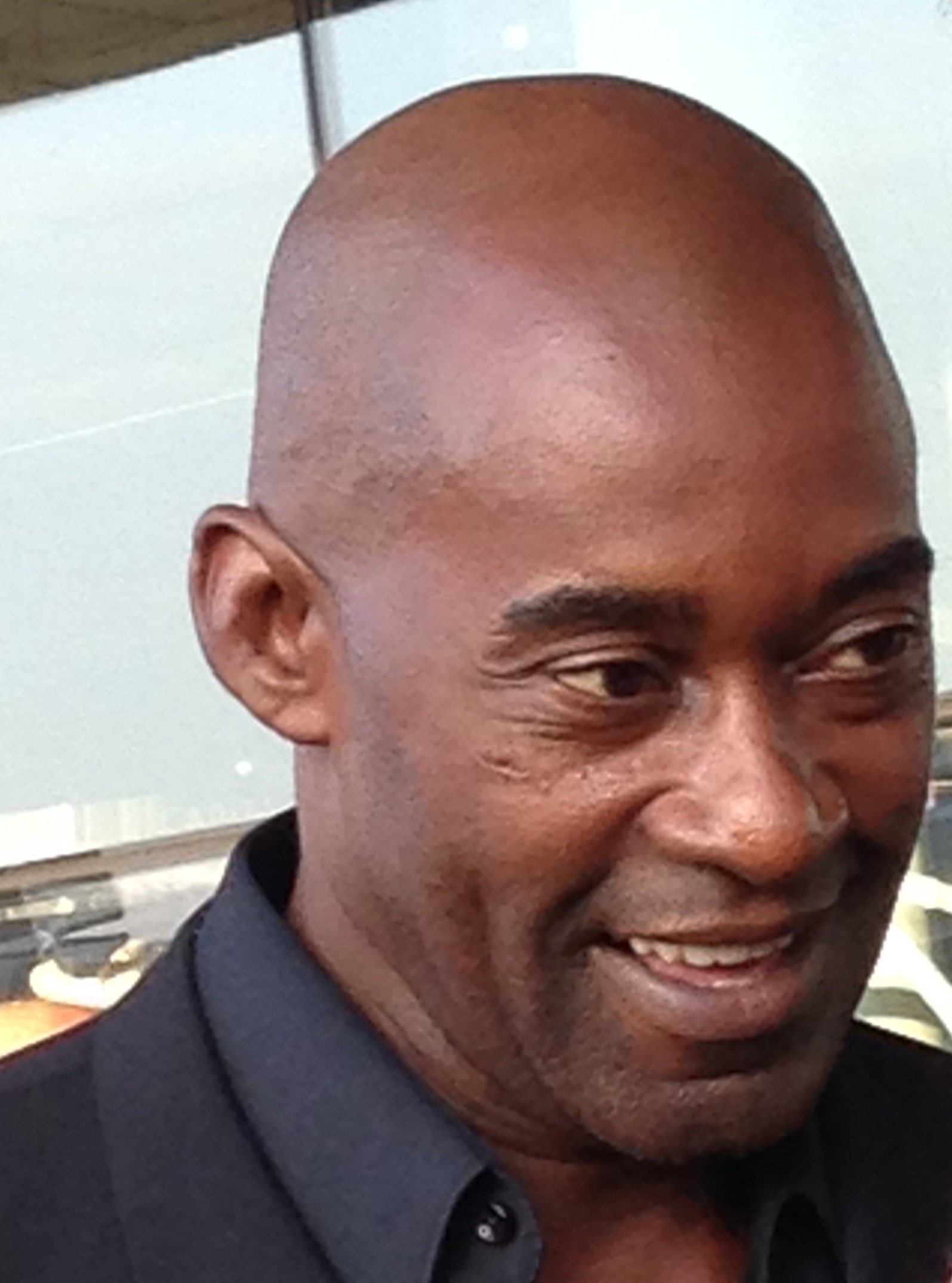
Rita's struggle with alcoholism is noticed by Martin "Ash" Ashford, portrayed by Patrick Robinson (pictured).

Following the introduction of Rita's husband, series producer Erika Hossington confirmed that the focus on Rita would continue for several months. She told Daniel Kilkelly of Digital Spy that Rita would "face a really tough time and be pushed to her emotional limit". Howman described the storyline as "a really nice journey for Rita" and said that she enjoyed exploring the character's backstory. Hossington praised Howman's performances and opined that she has performed well in the storyline. She thought that the storyline would be fascinating as the character has not been explored. Hossington commented, "In medical stories, Rita always wants to know the facts, but when the spotlight is turned on her and she's forced to face up to the truth about herself, she doesn't deal with it too well!" Howman enjoyed portraying the bigger material, although admitted that her schedule was "mental". She was thankful that the bigger storylines were spread between cast members.

After Mark's appearance, Rita takes leave from work. When she returns, she receives a "frosty reception" from her colleagues. Rita subsequently struggles and begins drinking alcohol, resulting in her being repeatedly late and making mistakes on the job. At the end of a shift, Ash sees Rita having a shot of vodka in the ED staff room. The following shift, Rita does not arrive for work as she is afraid that Ash will have her sacked. Ash becomes worried about Rita and visits her, but is shocked to discover the multiple empty bottles in her flat. Howman said that Rita is dealing with her problems how she finds best and added that Mark's appearance has had "quite dire consequences" for Rita. Rita later recovers from her problems and regains control of her life.

==== Mark's returns ====
In January 2015, Beckett reprised his role for another appearance and Mark returns after being released from prison. He returns on the day of Rita's first shift as clinical nurse manager. Howman told Reilly (What's on TV) that Rita sees her new position as "a chance to prove her professionalism" following Mark's first appearance. Mark wants to reconcile with Rita and tells her that he is a better person than he was, leaving Rita conflicted. Howman sympathised with her character and commented, "He hurt her and destroyed their lives. She loves him but hates what he did." Connie's young daughter, Grace Beauchamp (Emily Carey), is at the hospital at the same time as Mark and when she goes missing, Rita considers whether Mark is responsible. Howman called the situation "shady" and said that although Rita believes that Mark is not responsible, she does question whether Mark is "even darker than she thought he was".

Rita chooses to deal with the problem alone, but soon realises that she cannot. Howman pointed out that while Rita has learned from past errors, Grace's disappearance has massive consequences. Grace returns safe and well and she confirms that she has not been involved with Mark. However, Rita realises that she cannot trust Mark again and cuts ties with him. Howman explained that Rita cuts ties with Mark with "as much forgiveness and sincerity as she can muster". Howman found the episode hard to film. The actress enjoyed working with Beckett again and thought that they created a convincible chemistry between the couple.

Beckett reprised his role again in 2016 and Mark returns in April after being admitted to the ED with his girlfriend, Fiona Holden (Aimee Barrett). Beckett agreed to return after becoming interested in how to explore his character. Fiona, now an adult, is the underage girl who dated Mark before his imprisonment. Howman disliked their relationship and thought it made the characters appear "meant to be, but it's definitely not". Rita treats Fiona against advice and discovers that she has an ectopic pregnancy and needs surgery; when she informs Fiona, she accuses Rita of sabotaging her relationship with Mark. Fiona locks herself inside an office and refuses to move until she speaks privately with Rita. In a candid conversation, Fiona realises that Mark's actions were wrong and agrees to have a termination. When Fiona ends her relationship with Mark, he confronts Rita alone, leaving her "shaken". Beckett sympathised with Rita and told a reporter from Inside Soap that Mark ends the episode as "a pathetic man who's had his comeuppance and runs out of Holby with his tail between his legs". Howman enjoyed working with Beckett again and filming with Barrett. On the story and Barrett, she commented, "It's a really hard piece for everyone to play. Each part is difficult, but she was very good."

=== Feud with Connie Beauchamp ===
"In a way, Rita and Connie are oddly similar. They both want what's best for the department, but go about things in very different ways. Rita's a hands on, people-person and Connie's behaviour really tests her."

—Howman on the similarities between Rita and Connie. (2015)

Producers created a feud between Rita and Connie after the conclusion of Connie's previous feud. Hossington believed that Connie worked well with a rival and so, decided to introduce a feud for the character. She opined that the rivalry would be "electric" and better than Connie's previous feud, suggesting that there could be a violent altercation between the characters. The storyline begins when Connie sparks a feud with Rita following Grace's decision to leave Connie and live with her father. Connie continues a "deadly hate campaign against Rita" and as Connie implements changes in the ED, Dylan Keogh (William Beck) and Lily Chao (Crystal Yu) begin to suffer as a result, causing Rita to challenge Connie's behaviour. Connie berates Rita, calling her "incompetent and a danger to the hospital". Howman explained that Connie is attacking Rita because she is upset following Grace's departure. Connie then reveals that she blames Rita for Grace's departure. Howman told Reilly (What's on TV) that Connie completely blames Rita for losing her daughter, which has made her lose "all perspective". Howman and Mealing enjoyed portraying the characters' feud and wanted the audience to like it too.

Outside of her feud with Rita, Connie develops a close friendship with former surgeon Alfred Maxwell (Michael Byrne), who is dying from motor neuron disease. He is later admitted to the ED and Connie does not allow anyone else to treat him. Following Alfred's death, Rita discovers that Connie asked nurse Lofty Chiltern (Lee Mead) to dispose of his blood tests, so she has the bloods tested for drugs. Mealing thought that Rita sees this as her chance to "get rid of Connie". Rita discovers a drug in Alfred's blood system and after finding out that Connie was visiting Alfred the previous night, she reports Connie to the police for euthanasia. Hospital staff are questioned by the police as part of the investigation and Rita is pleased with Connie's absence. Connie confesses to stealing medication, but states that she only gave Alfred two tablets, which could not kill him. She tells the police that the remaining drugs are in her office. Before the police can arrive, Rita steals the drugs from Connie's office. Mealing called Rita's actions "malicious". Connie is then charged with Alfred's murder. Senior nurse Charlie Fairhead (Derek Thompson) soon realises that Rita has framed Connie and pressures her into letting him return the drugs to the police without incriminating her. Mealing observed that Charlie "puts the moral thumbscrews on Rita".

=== Relationship with Iain Dean ===
Following her darker storylines, producers romantically paired Rita with paramedic Iain Dean (Michael Stevenson) to provide the characters with lighter stories. Hossington told Kilkelly (Digital Spy) that the coupling would be surprising and dissimilar to other pairings on the drama. While remembering Jeff on the one-year anniversary of his death, Iain makes sexual advances towards Rita and asks if she would like a one-night stand, which she agrees to. Reilly (What's on TV) wondered if the couple could become "Casualty's new favourite couple". Howman later told the reporter that Iain is the first person that Rita has loved since Mark, which is important to her following her trauma with Mark. The actress enjoyed working with Stevenson.

Hossington confirmed that the storyline would become darker throughout the series. Following his return, Mark begins harassing Rita; when she confides in Iain about the harassment, Iain confronts him, leaving Rita "impressed". As her relationship with Iain deteriorates, Rita resorts to "desperate measures" to save the relationship. Howman explained that Rita would struggle with the situation. Iain struggles with his feelings for Rita, but hands her a key to his flat. At the end of the shift, Iain goes on a date with another woman, shocking and upsetting Rita. Howman confirmed that this would spark some darker behaviour for her character as she prepares to fight for her relationship. Rita remains angry with Iain and he tries ending the relationship but changes his mind when he finds Rita scared and upset after discovering that someone has slashed her car tyres. When Rita notices Iain flirting with a nurse, she claims that Mark was responsible for slashing her car tyres and is stalking her, despite being told by police that Mark was not responsible.

Howman enjoyed exploring the psychology of Rita and portraying the character's actions. She hoped that the audience would understand that Rita's behaviour stems from her difficult marriage to Mark. The actress opined that Rita was still "redeemable" because she is "human". After Iain ends the relationship, a "mortified" Rita hides from him and hits her face on a car wing mirror. She develops a black eye and blames the incident on Mark, claiming that he assaulted her. Their colleagues berate Iain for leaving Rita, so he decides to defend Rita and confront Mark, causing Rita to confess the truth. Rita's colleagues are shocked by her lies and give her a "frosty reception" when she attends work. Rita only receives support from consultant Elle Gardner (Jaye Griffiths), who had experienced a similar incident recently. Rita tries to apologise to Iain, but he rejects her and tells her to resign from her job. She agrees and decides to leave Holby. The scenes, featured in the series 30 episode "The Fear", first broadcast on 16 July 2016, marked Howman's departure from Casualty after three years on the drama. Reflecting on her character's storylines, Howman told Reilly (What's on TV) that there was "always a lot going on with Rita Freeman", which she felt made her captivating to an audience.

== Reception ==
"Some staff arrive at Holby City's ED with a bang. But there are other hard-working medics who can be beavering away for ages before we even get a whiff of their life outside the hospital. Nurse Rita Freeman has been part of the team for months, yet we know little about her private life."

—Sarah Ellis of Inside Soap on the exploration of Rita's backstory.

Elaine Reilly (What's on TV) described Rita as a "gutsy", "personable and popular nurse". Radio Times critic David Brown predicted that Rita would be "the dynamic yet sensitive type" upon viewing her introduction. Reviewing Rita's first episode, Sue Haasler, a writer for Pauseliveaction, called the character a "practical, independent, feisty" nurse who "knows what she's doing". Haasler thought Rita proved that "she has both a cool head in a crisis and a head for heights" in her introduction. Haasler later praised Howman's performances during the death of the crushed man on Rita's shift with the paramedic team. Brown also reflected on the episode, commenting, "You don't send a bubbly, easy-going nurse like Rita out on a shift with the paramedics without her confidence being completely shaken by the end of it."

Reilly thought that Rita's life "hit rock bottom" when Mark arrives at the hospital, while a South Wales Echo reporter named the moment in their "3 to see" column of the day. Likewise, an Evening Gazette columnist listed its immediate aftermath in their "3 to see" column of the day. Brown's colleague, Alison Graham, expected that Rita would be promoted to senior staff nurse due to her empathetic nature. She also observed that when Mark is admitted to the ED, "Rita's eyebrows shoot up and before long she’s casting furtive glances like death rays." Graham also branded the character "Mother Teresa in trainers" and "Saint Rita" in her reviews of Casualty.

Haasler reflected on the darker element to Rita following the exploration of her backstory in a review. She deemed the story "a somewhat depressing storyline for a woman who was formerly as competent and assured as Rita". Graham thought it was obvious that Rita was struggling as she appeared "hunched on her sofa drinking too much red wine and watching Countryfile" after a challenging shift. She also described the character as someone who "never misses a chance to try to improve the life of a hapless stranger". Haasler enjoyed Ash's friendship with Rita and sympathised with Rita's dependence on alcohol.

Reilly noted that Rita is placed "in the doghouse with clinical lead Connie" when Grace goes missing. Haasler enjoyed the feud between Rita and Connie, describing it as "an interesting set-up for two strong characters". On the feud between Rita and Connie, Sophie Dainty of Digital Spy commented, "Let's face it, Rita was never a match for Connie but she tried her best to be – and very nearly succeeded." Graham thought that after her darker storylines with Mark and Connie, Rita had become "a frowning, joyless nun", so was pleased when she was paired with Iain. Haasler disliked the writers' decision to portray Rita as desperate in her pairing with Iain. She thought Rita appeared foolish and opined, "I'm cross about that because Rita is worth ten of Iain". Reilly observed that Rita went to "extreme and sinister lengths" to save her relationship with Iain. Graham called Rita's lies prior to her exit "appalling" and on the character's exit, she wrote, "Emergency department personnel are so frequently sent to Coventry there should be a direct bus service from Holby." Similarly, Reilly pointed out that Rita departed "under a cloud with only Charlie to wave her farewell".
