= Caleb Knight =

Fictional character from Casualty

- Casualty character
- Richard Winsor as Caleb Knight
- First appearance: "Brothers at Arms"; 18 January 2014
- Last appearance: "Same Old Same Old"; 21 August 2021
- Portrayed by: Richard Winsor
- Spinoff(s): "On Call" (2015)
- Duration: 2014–2017, 2021

In-universe information
- Occupation: Specialist registrar, emergency medicine
- Significant others: Taylor Ashbie; Alicia Munroe
- Relatives: Emilie Groome (mother); Matilda Hardy (adoptive mother); Ethan Hardy (brother); Bodhi Khatri (nephew)

Caleb "Cal" Knight is a fictional character from the BBC medical drama Casualty, played by actor Richard Winsor. He first appeared in the series twenty-eight episode "Brothers at Arms", broadcast on 18 January 2014. Winsor had previously auditioned for a role in Casualty's spin-off show Holby City. Producers were impressed and recalled him to read for the part of Cal. Winsor's casting was announced alongside George Rainsford who was hired to play Cal's brother Ethan Hardy. The pair had to pass a screen test together as producers were looking for a strong sibling chemistry. Cal's role in the show is a Specialist registrar in emergency medicine. He was originally introduced as a locum. The medic is played as a lothario and womaniser type character. He can manipulate those around him with charm to better his career. Writers gave Cal a backstory detailing the difficult relationship with his father and brother. Despite having the same parents Cal and Ethan had different upbringings, which sets up a sibling rivalry. Their relationship has been important in the development of both characters. Executive producer Oliver Kent has called the character consistent because when faced with trauma, Cal gets drunk, sleeps with women and makes a fool of himself.

The character has been subject to stories including a relationship with Taylor Ashbie (Sarah Jayne Dunn). She is later exposed as a con artist and steals Ethan's inheritance money. In 2015, the show explored a story focusing on Cal and Ethan's family history. The storyline was pitched by Casualty's co-creator Paul Unwin. It features Cal becoming a father to Matilda and making an effort to change his life. He learns that she is not his biological daughter and gives her up. He then discovers that he was adopted and locates his biological mother Emilie Groome (Carol Royle). She has Huntington's disease and fears he has inherited the disease. He then has to cope with Emilie's eventual death. Winsor made his final appearance as Cal, following his on-screen death, in the series thirty-one episode "Reap the Whirlwind − Part Two", broadcast on 29 April 2017. He reprised the role for a guest stint in 2021. The character was well received by television drama critics, and Winsor received a nomination for a Best Drama Star award for his portrayal of Cal.

== Casting ==
On 4 September 2013 it was announced that Richard Winsor had been cast in the role of Cal. George Rainsford was cast to play Cal's brother Ethan Hardy and it was revealed that both characters would arrive to fill job vacancies at Holby City hospital. Casting directors oversaw an extremely thorough and careful audition process when searching for actors. They envisioned a duo who could convey a testing but loving relationship and made it their objective to find it. Winsor had previously auditioned for a role in Casualty's spin-off show Holby City in 2012. He undertook screen tests for the role but was unsuccessful. Producers were impressed with his performance and notified him that they wanted to work with him again. Casualty production invited Winsor to audition and read for both Cal and Ethan. Winsor was introduced to Rainsford and they carried out a screen test audition. This was to check their suitability for the sibling relationship Casualty needed. They acted out scenes in medical costume and make-up. Rainsford has spoken of an instant on-screen chemistry the pair struck-up.

The BBC described Cal as a "pure adrenaline junkie" in comparison to the "studious witty whizz kid" Ethan. Writers used the arrival of the characters to have a "big impact" on the dynamic within the emergency department featured in the show. Casualty's executive producer Oliver Kent stated that "the arrival of Ethan and Caleb will instantly change the dynamic of the ED. Whilst very different characters, one thing they will have in common is an ability to charm, so expect sparks to fly." The character made his first on-screen appearance in the series twenty-eight episode "Brothers at Arms", which was broadcast on 18 January 2014.

== Development ==
=== Characterisation and introduction ===
Cal likes to live life in the fast lane. His smooth, unflappable style runs through every aspect of his personality, but this could be seen by some as arrogance. Nothing phases Cal. His arrival at Holby was something of a shock to younger brother, Ethan, and it's not long before Ethan's frustration at, once again, being in his big brother's shadow starts to show.

— BBC Online.

Caleb, commonly referred to by his nickname "Cal", is characterised as a confident and self-assured man with who is played as irresistible to women. A writer from BBC Online described "a sense of a darker, emotionally damaged soul underneath" which women are attracted to. They added "Cal exudes confidence to get what he wants, but, occasionally, his bravado slips and he has to dig a little deeper to find out who he really is." Work wise Cal is an instinctive doctor practising within a busy emergency department. He is unafraid to break rules to gain an advantage. With a liking of the party lifestyle he initially failed medical school and had to resit his exams. This made him behind in career progress to his brother Ethan.

Winsor described the medic as "a bit of lothario" who likes women. He is a "brilliant doctor" who is "living the dream". Cal is "instinctive" in his approach to medicine. He has much success with women as soon as he arrives. He also shares "sexual flirtations" with other characters. Cal thrives in an adrenaline-fuelled situation and writers tend to include him on treatment teams following big accidents. He is able to take control of the hospital chaos caused by major medical incidents. Winsor said that his character also likes to control his surroundings. "He knows what he wants and he goes for it, and that sometimes means manipulating the situations around him." He has natural charm and he uses it to his own advantage. But Winsor stressed that Cal does not have malicious intent when he takes advantage to progress in his career. In one early scene the character is shown with his top off. Winsor that the scene conveyed an introduction to Cal, a glimpse of his persona. He added "it's like they're saying: here we go, here's a hot new doctor. And he's got to get into the shower, obviously! It's just a given." While interviewed for the Retford Times Winsor discussed Cal's reputation as a womaniser. He believed that nobody is one-dimensional and he made an effort to play Cal as much more than an archetypal lothario. He added that the character "has insecurities about his family and his job. He makes bad decisions but they always seem to come out of care and love."

Writers gave Cal a dramatic introduction involving a location stunt away from the hospital set. Cal saves a woman's life when she is involved in a car accident. The limousine is trapped hanging over the edge of a bridge. He enters the vehicle and performs a medical procedure before rescuing his patient. The stunt was the first scenes Winsor filmed with the show. He recalled the experience as "fantastic", climbing into the limousine and acting out a medical procedure he tried to learn fifteen minutes before the cameras began recording. The interior shots were filmed in a studio with the limousine suspended fifteen feet in the air. There was rocking and tilting movement effects added to add to the realism. Winsor told David Brown of Radio Times that "I had no choice but to be convincing." When they filmed the scenes members of the public became concerned that there had been a major car crash on the bridge, unaware it was a filming session.

=== Sibling rivalry ===
Cal's relationship with his brother has been a focal point of Casualty storylines. Ethan has often felt like he lives in Cal's shadow despite being in the same profession. He has provided Ethan with a "lifetime of frustration" and has to continually be there for Cal to solve his problems. Winsor told Daniel Kilkelly from Digital Spy that "sparks fly between them as they're always trying to get one over on each other!" The two brothers are completely different personality wise and in their professional approach. The actor told Brown that Cal and Ethan are both "brilliant" at their jobs but for different reasons. Ethan is played as a doctor who abides by the rules. Cal is more "instinctive" to approach cases his own way. The actor believes that this is a considerable factor that causes arguments between them.

But the pair have a backstory in which their relationship is equally as difficult. Winsor stated "well, they're certainly not on the same page. There's a lot of animosity between them from years back." They had different upbringings despite sharing the same parents. Cal had to achieve by himself because he had fallen out with his father. He has been described as a "very high-powered lothario ED doctor" much like Cal. He had traits of idiocy which caused him and Cal to argue. He wanted to leave home to escape his father and left at a young age. From there Cal had to fund his own education by working jobs. But Ethan remained at home and was exposed to the "silver spoon" upbringing more so than Cal. Winsor believes this is the cause of the resent his character feels towards Ethan. But blames Cal, adding "there's a slight ego with Cal as he's done it all himself." Other problems for the pair occur due to their involvement with others characters. Cal's love interests cause feuding between the two. But if need be the siblingS will defend each other should they be placed in a certain scenarios. He concluded that "most of the time, though, we wind each other up the wrong way." The two characters appear through a period of stories in which they are estranged. Ethan disowns Cal when he steals his inheritance money. Producers eventually decided to unite the characters to accommodate new stories.

=== Relationship with Taylor Ashbie ===
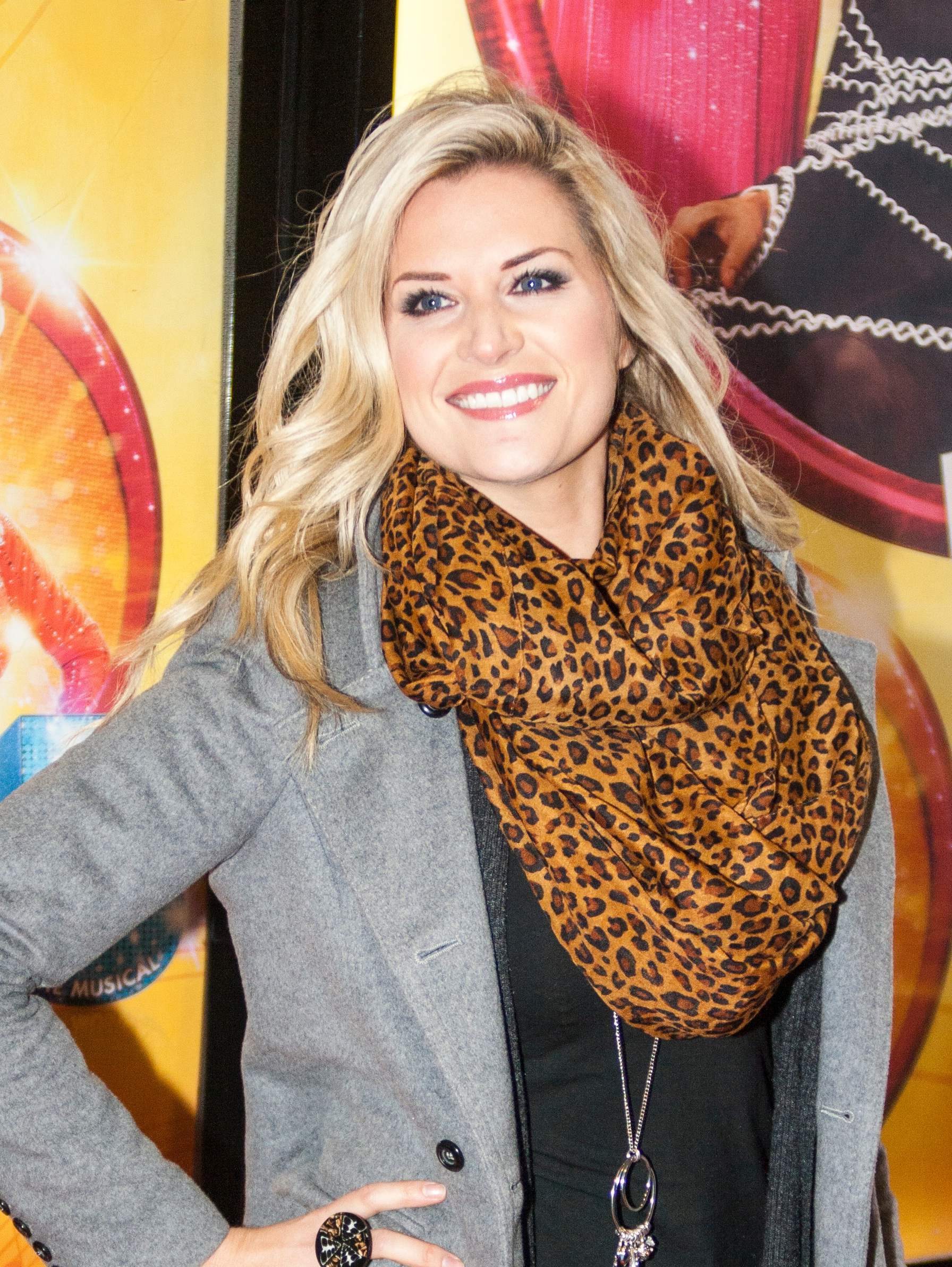
Sarah Jayne Dunn plays Cal's love interest Taylor Ashbie.

Producers created a romance storyline for Cal alongside guest character Taylor Ashbie (Sarah Jayne Dunn). The two actors had previously worked alongside each other on the soap opera Hollyoaks. She is a patient who arrives at the hospital because she has breathing difficulties. Taylor herself is a medic and knows that she needs treatment. Soon after her arrival she gains Cal's attention and he begins involving himself in her treatment despite it being Zoe Hanna's (Sunetra Sarker) case. But Cal ends up humiliated when "feisty" Taylor criticises Cal's unprofessional behaviour. Dunn told a reporter from Inside Soap that the hospital is an inappropriate place to try and start romances. Taylor just wants to be treated and discharged in the minimal amount of time. Dunn added that it was the last thing her character wanted while she was unwell. But Taylor later changes her mind and arranges to keep in contact with Cal.

Taylor turns out to be a con woman after money. She claims to need funds for a charitable act. She manages to convince Cal to supply her with the money. But he takes Ethan's fifteen-thousand pound inheritance and agrees to loan it to her. She shocks Cal by stealing the money and leaving the area. Taylor's deception leaves Cal heart-broken. Executive producer Oliver Kent later announced that Dunn would reprise her role as Taylor again and appear in late 2015.

=== Fatherhood and adoption discovery ===
Casualty producer Erika Hossington announced a new story for Cal and Ethan which focuses on their family history and played out in the final quarter of 2015. She told Daniel Kilkelly from Digital Spy that "we've been planning this for a year - it's a very in-depth story and it will strike at the heart of their sibling relationship." Casualty's co-creator Paul Unwin pitched the storyline and the production team "loved" the idea. The plot formed Casualty's "big Christmas storyline".

The plot was introduced at an interval Ethan and Cal had repaired their relationship. They had been estranged after Taylor stole Ethan's inheritance because of Cal. Ethan decided to help Cal get refocused on his career and improve his patient care skills. The character became the subject of a special mini-episode of Casualty titled "On Call". Created to coincide with the show's anniversary celebrations; it was aired via the interactive feature, the BBC Red Button and also released via the BBC iPlayer. The storyline followed the return of Taylor who arrives to see Cal. She hands over her daughter, Matilda, claiming she is Cal's child. Taylor tricks Cal into believing they have a future but abandons the baby in his care.

Winsor told Elaine Reilly from What's on TV that instantaneously Cal's feelings for Taylor return. He is in a confused state unsure if he actually hates or loves her and even contemplates reporting her to authorities. But with a new baby in his life Cal is faced with the prospect of a future he had not planned. The actor described Cal as being in a regretful and self-loathing state but he learns to care for Matilda. It is the hostility and ill-feeling felt towards Taylor that slows progress to accepting his new-found daughter. But with time writers used the opportunity to give the character a new direction in his story. Winsor explained "he discovers he wants to commit to something worthwhile in his life in a way he never has before. It's a chance for redemption and a more mature, responsible life." The story is "massive" and affects both brothers "hugely" as they adjust to looking after a baby. Winsor uttered both "funny and touching" moments alongside "twists and turns that are going to challenge them in dramatic ways." The actor was also pleased with the "real gift" writers had provided in uniting Cal and Ethan following Taylor's damaging scams.

When Matilda falls ill Cal has to take a blood test check compatibility. In a storyline twist a paternity test reveals that Matilda is not Cal's daughter. Winsor told Reilly that a "heart-broken" state takes over his on-screen counterpart and he goes into denial. Her inclusion in his life transformed him into a more responsible character. Matilda not being his child means his changed attitude was for nothing. Cal has to face the fact he cannot keep Matilda in his care and he contact social services to put her into care. The actor explained that Cal deals with the situation the only way he knows - "turning his back on everything and self-loathing. He gets drunk and goes back to his bravado, womanising ways."

Cal later finds inconsistencies between his blood group and his late mother's, which means she was not his biological mother. Winsor told Reilly that Cal cannot believe he was adopted and it "tears him apart". But his worry that Ethan is not a blood-relative is the "most devastating part". The medic decides to keep his discovery a secret from Ethan. Winsor defended his character's dishonesty because he does not know how best to tell Ethan, adding "the longer he leaves it, the worse it gets." Writers had planned for Senior Charge Nurse Charlie Fairhead (Derek Thompson) to be Cal's confidant and Ethan to remain oblivious for a greater number of episodes. This creates a friendship between Cal and Charlie. Winsor named it a "lovely" screen bond with Charlie assuming a "fatherly role". Cal decides to track down his biological mother with the aim of collecting maximum information about his adoption and Ethan's maternity. Winsor stated "Cal wants to find out if Ethan is his true brother, because they have an important bond." The discovery of his mother sets Cal up for a "downward spiral" style of storyline. The actor later reflected on the storyline, stating "this story has a real domino affect, from Taylor, the baby, and now to this revelation about the adoption, and the question 'are Ethan and Cal brothers?' It's beautifully constructed and there's a lot more to come!"

Producer Oliver Kent later announced that Ethan would discover the adoption secret. Writers switched the focus of the fall-out more to Ethan's point-of-view for the remainder of the story. Kent teased "fairly major" ramifications for Ethan. Emilie Groome (Carol Royle), a character suffering from Huntington's disease is revealed to be Cal and Ethan's mother. But the disease is bad news for the characters as they may have inherited it. A writer from Inside Soap revealed that Cal's relief of locating his mother is out-weighed by anger he feels because she never contracted him warning him about the hereditary disease.

"The thing about Cal is that he's always consistent: every time something goes a little bit wrong, he gets drunk, goes out on the pull and makes a fool of himself."

— Executive producer Oliver Kent on Cal's coping mechanism through dramatic stories.

When Emilie injures herself and Cal dislocates her shoulder looking after her, Ethan is forced to treat her. She develops complications from pneumonia and fears she will die in hospital. She makes it clear she wants to die at home but Cal argues with Ethan over Emilie's care. Her condition deteriorates and they are forced to work together to provide a solution for their dying mother. Ethan and Cal steal an ambulance and take Emilie to the seaside where she can die in peace with them by her side. Ethan and Cal also receive results which reveal which of them is suffering from Huntington's disease.

The Huntington's disease storyline was researched very thoroughly. The show worked alongside Huntington's Disease Association for advice and support to create the storyline. Royle also carried out much private research including meeting with sufferers. Casualty's researcher Ross Southard said "It has been an extremely rewarding and important storyline for us. We really hope that Emilie's story and subsequently Cal and Ethan's story will help to highlight and raise awareness of HD and continue to help those affected by the disease."

=== Departure ===
On 7 February 2017, Sophie Dainty of Digital Spy confirmed that the cast and crew had been filming a funeral for a regular character. The show's producer Erika Hossington also confirmed that a "very shocking" event would happen after another character is involved in a car accident. This led to speculation that Lily Chao (Crystal Yu) would die after she was involved in a hit and run during the episode broadcast on 22 April. However, during the following episode, broadcast on 29 April, Cal was stabbed to death after getting in a fight with Scott Ellisson (Will Austin), who blamed Ethan for his father's death .

Of his decision to leave the show, Winsor said "I've had a wonderful time, but after three and a half years of doing great storylines, I decided that I wanted to find new challenges and explore new places in the world. I wouldn't have left if I hadn't felt satisfied with my time on the show." Winsor told Dainty that after informing the producers that he wanted to leave, he agreed to stay for a further four months, as they came up with his Cal's exit storyline. Winsor admitted to feeling shock upon learning that Cal would die, but eventually thought it was a great storyline and he liked that Cal would be seen "almost as a hero." The actor also liked that his departure was kept a secret, commenting "I'm glad it's been kept a secret and I think the red-herring of Lily being run over was a very clever device to get to that point."

=== Return ===
Winsor reprised the role in 2021 for the show's thirty-fifth anniversary special episode. The episode explores a day in the ED which has dramatic consequences for the characters. It is set in 2016 when Cal would be alive. Charles Dale and Tony Marshall also reprised their respective roles as Big Mac and Noel Garcia for the episode. Loretta Preece, the show's series producer, expressed her excitement at the characters' return. Winsor teased that his character would be "haunting Ethans [sic] dreams and flashing back in time". A trailer was released on 15 July 2021 to promote Cal's return, depicting Ethan waking in a hospital bed and talking to Cal. Following the episode's broadcast, Calli Kitson of the Metro confirmed that Winsor would appear in further episodes.

== Reception ==
Winsor was nominated for "Best Drama Star" at the 2016 Inside Soap Awards. Ethan & Cal meeting their biological mother was nominated "Best Drama Storyline". In August 2017, Cal's murder was longlisted for Best Drama Storyline at the Inside Soap Awards. The nomination made the viewer-voted shortlist, but lost out to Casualty's helicopter crash. Holly Wade from the Radio Times branded the character a "womaniser", an "incredibly confident and an instinctive doctor" and a "constant annoyance" to Ethan. The sibling duo proved popular with viewers. Winsor felt fortunate that fan liked Cal and Ethan's relationship and grateful for support of their stories. Reilly (What's on TV) stated that "the love-hate storylines between Cal and Ethan have captivated fans and are still going strong." Their colleague branded Cal a "serial womaniser". A Retford Times reporter said "Dr Cal has been on a rollercoaster storyline since he was introduced to Casualty viewers in 2014." Their colleague said that Winsor put in some "eye-catching performances" as Cal. Matt Baylis of the Daily Express was unimpressed with both Casualty and Cal. He criticised scenes depicting Cal confused about his first meeting with Emilie. Baylis accused the show of disregarding viewer intellect and uttered he would trust stupid Cal to treat him in hospital.

Peter Dyke of the Daily Star branded the character a "hunky registrar", "womaniser" and the "Holby heartthrob". A reporter from the Daily Mirror chose an episode centric to Cal in their "pick of the day" feature. They branded him a "normally unflappable medic" character. An Inside Soap writer opined that Cal's break-up with Taylor marked the first time the "lothario" had his heart broken. They later added that being a father was "an unlikely new role" for the medic. Alison Graham writing for Radio Times branded the character "Calamity Cal" and added "what Cal really needs is some perspective".
