= Orderly =

Unlicensed hospital assistant

In healthcare, an orderly (also known as a ward assistant, nurse assistant or healthcare assistant) is a hospital attendant whose job consists of assisting medical and nursing staff with various nursing and medical interventions. These duties are classified as routine tasks involving no risk for the patient.

== Job details ==
Orderlies are often utilized in various hospital departments.Orderly duties can range in scope depending on the area of the health care facility they are employed. For that reason, duties can range from assisting in the physical restraint of combative patients, assisting physicians with the application of casts, transporting patients, shaving patients, and providing other similar routine personal care to setting up specialised hospital equipment such as bed traction arrays.

Orderlies are typically found in emergency departments, operating rooms, psychiatric wards, long-term care facilities, and orthopaedics departments.

Orderlies are described as nonlicensed hospital assistants who are instructed to perform delegated functions under the direct supervision of a licensed practitioner in the healthcare setting.

In the United States, orderlies have been phased out of healthcare facilities in recent years, their functions having been replaced by patient care assistants and certified nursing assistants.

Orderlies in United Kingdom hospitals were known as "attendants" (primarily in lunatic asylums), but that role has been phased out. The nearest role left to a male hospital assistant is that of porter, but that is more a logistical role, moving patients and equipment around the hospital. This is not to be confused with healthcare assistants, who are essentially carers for patients (not qualified or licensed health care professionals), and may be of both sexes.

== See also ==
- Certified Nursing Assistant
- Activities of daily living assistance
