= Hospital porter =

Hospital porters are employed to move patients between wards and departments and to move goods and vital supplies including medical equipment, linen, blood, and samples.

Traditionally, hospitals often had a dispatcher, a person sat at a central desk, taking calls from across all wards and departments where a porter is needed. Just as porters could be needed at any time of the day or night so was this co-ordination function, making it quite an expensive overhead. This has often been replaced by a system using pagers. A more technically advanced solution, giving visibility of porters and allocating work more efficiently can reduce cost and improve efficiency, prioritising the most urgent tasks and giving more detail of what is required.

The privatization of services in the British National Health Service often led to the outsourcing of such work to private contractors. When Homerton University Hospital NHS Foundation Trust proposed in 2020 to extend its soft facilities management contract with ISS Mediclean until 2025 170 of the trust's 464 doctors complained to the chief executive that their colleagues in cleaning, portering, catering and security services received worse pay and worse terms and conditions than NHS employees, including only statutory sick pay.

== See also ==
- Orderly
