= Chelsea Halfpenny =

English actress (born 1991)

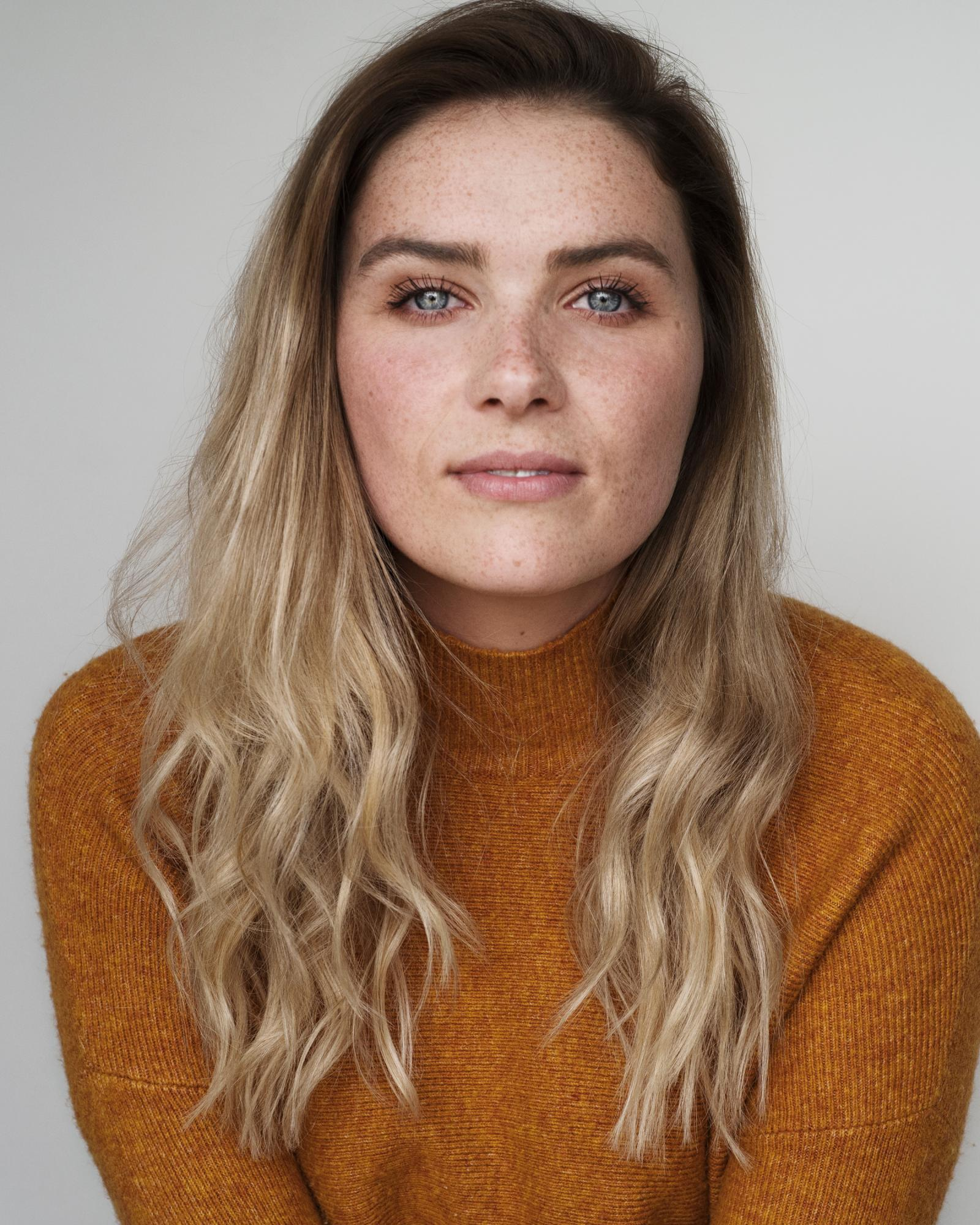
- Born: 26 September 1991 (age 34); Gateshead, Tyne and Wear, England
- Occupation: Actress
- Years active: 2004–present
- Television: Emmerdale; Casualty
- Partner: James Baxter (2018–present)
- Children: 1
- Relatives: Jill Halfpenny (aunt)

Chelsea Halfpenny (born 26 September 1991) is an English actress, known for her roles as Amy Wyatt in the ITV soap opera Emmerdale and Alicia Munroe in the BBC drama Casualty. She played Jenna Hunterson in the 2022 tour of Waitress.

== Early life ==
Halfpenny attended St Augustine's Primary School in Leam Lane, Gateshead and then went on to attend St Edmund Campion Catholic School in Wrekenton, both of which her aunt, Jill Halfpenny, attended. Halfpenny then attended Sixth Form at Heworth Grange School in Gateshead to complete A level studies. She also attended Saturday fame school classes at the Reavley Theatre School, Gateshead. Halfpenny lived on the Leam Lane Estate, in Gateshead.

== Career ==
=== Television and film ===
Halfpenny's professional acting career began in 2004 when she appeared in the Casualty episode "What Parents Do", playing an eleven-year-old girl called Karine. In the same year, she was cast the role of Lucy Summerbee in popular children's television series Byker Grove. Halfpenny secured the role after answering an advertisement in the Newcastle Evening Chronicle. After leaving Byker Grove in 2006, Halfpenny continued to work in the North East. She featured in an independent short film for Sham Films, called Cherry Pop.

Halfpenny featured in the 2010 short film Compulsion, directed by Andy McVicar. She Played the female lead Kelly, in a story of young adolescent love. The film was funded by Northern Film and Media's Digital Nation Initiative Fund. Made for £20,000, Compulsion won the British Council Azz xx ward for "Best New Short Film'" at the London Film Festival. On 8 October 2010, Halfpenny made her first appearance on Yorkshire-based soap opera Emmerdale as runaway teenager Amy Wyatt, who became a regular character. On 11 October 2013, Halfpenny confirmed that she was to leave Emmerdale. Her last episode was shown on 14 November 2013. Later in 2013, Halfpenny portrayed Sarah in a short film called Lilium, a production by students at Teesside University.

In 2015, Halfpenny joined the cast of BBC medical drama Casualty. She portrayed the role of Alicia Munroe, a year 1 foundation officer doctor. Halfpenny's first episode aired on 19 September 2015. Halfpenny had signed for eight episodes and departed the show on 14 November 2015, but in May 2016, it was announced that Halfpenny would return to Casualty, with her return episode airing on 30 July 2016. On 15 January 2019, it was confirmed that Halfpenny would be leaving Casualty after four years.

=== Music and theatre ===
In 2009, Halfpenny progressed to the Open Mic UK national finals with Newcastle-based girl-band Vevo. In 2011, Halfpenny featured on a DVD release by MWM Records, called Big River Big Songs. She sang a solo of "I Still Love Him" and sang a duet, "The Shoe Makker" with fellow Emmerdale cast member Charlie Hardwick. Both songs sung by Halfpenny were made for paid download on iTunes on 12 March 2012.

In 2012, Halfpenny took part in Sunday for Sammy, a biannual charity concert held in aid of the Sammy Johnson Memorial Fund, which benefits young performers in the Newcastle area. Starring alongside Angela Lonsdale and Denise Welch, Halfpenny played Lambrini, a young Newcastle woman on community service. In 2014, she appeared in a variety of roles in the West Yorkshire Playhouse production of Maxine Peake's Beryl – celebrating the sporting achievements of cyclist Beryl Burton. In 2019, it was announced that she would be taking over the role of Judy in 9 to 5: The Musical, as part of the West End theatre production. In late 2020, it was announced Halfpenny would star in the UK-wide tour of Waitress in the role of Jenna.

== Personal life ==
Halfpenny is the daughter of Newcastle DJ Paula Halfpenny and the niece of actress Jill Halfpenny.

In 2018, she began dating actor James Baxter, and they announced their engagement on 13 June 2021. In April 2023, Baxter and Halfpenny announced that they were expecting their first child together. In June 2023, Halfpenny announced the birth of her and Baxter's daughter.

== Filmography ==
=== Film ===
Year	Title	Role	Notes	Ref.
2007	Cherry Pop	Tracy	Short film	
2010	Compulsion	Kelly	Short film funded by Northern Film and Media	
2018	Cry Baby Blue	Abi	Short film	

=== Television ===
Year 2024	Title the dumping ground	Role Beth	Notes	Ref.
2004	Casualty	Karine	Series 18; episode 26: "What Parents Do"	
2004–2006	Byker Grove	Lucy Summerbee	Main role; series 16–18; 23 episodes	
2010–2013	Emmerdale	Amy Wyatt	Series regular; 412 episodes	
2015	All Star Family Fortunes	Herself - Contestant	Series 11; episode 8: "Wes Brown vs Jill Halfpenny"	
2015–2019	Casualty	Alicia Munroe	Regular role; series 30–33; 100 episodes	
2020	Night Force	Herself - Narrator	Episodes 1–10	
2021	Grantchester	Lily Bradley	Series 6; episode 5	
2025	Vera	Kimberley Martin	Series 14; episode 1: "Inside"	

== Awards and nominations ==
Year	Award	Category	Work	Result	Ref.
2012	British Council Award	Best Film Short	Compulsion	Nominated	
2012	National Television Awards 2012	Best Newcomer	Emmerdale	Nominated	
2012	British Soap Awards 2012	Best Actress	Emmerdale	Nominated	
