= Richard Winsor =

British actor and dancer (born 1982)

- Born: 4 January 1982 (age 43); Thoresby, Nottinghamshire, England
- Occupations: Actor, dancer
- Years active: 2001–present

Richard Winsor (born 4 January 1982) is a British actor and dancer. He is best known for his role as Caleb Knight in the long-running BBC television medical drama series Casualty from January 2014 until April 2017, when his character was killed off after being stabbed by a patient's relative. He reprised the role in August 2021 but as a hallucination of Cal experienced by Cal's bereaved brother Ethan.

In 2010, he played Tomas in the British film StreetDance 3D produced by Vertigo Films and he also appeared as the character Father Francis in Hollyoaks in 2011. In 2018 and 2019, he has appeared as Tony Manero in the stage musical version of Saturday Night Fever.

Richard Winsor is a trained dancer and has starred in several Matthew Bourne productions. In August 2001, he joined Bourne's company Adventures in Motion Pictures (later to become New Adventures) for the US tour of Car Man continuing in the role until early 2002 with tours in France and Japan. In 2002, he appeared in the production of Play Without Words which opened to excellent reviews at the National Theatre and which was later to be given two prestigious Olivier Awards. With Bourne he created and then played 'Dorian' in the sell-out Edinburgh festival and London runs of Dorian Gray, a dance/theatre adaptation of Oscar Wilde's novel The Picture of Dorian Gray, and 'Edward' in Bourne's Edward Scissorhands. In 2013, Winsor collaborated with a Japanese dance company on a revival production of Dorian in Tokyo. In 2011, he starred as The Swan/The Stranger in Bourne's Swan Lake in the UK and on world tours including New York and Tokyo and which has subsequently been released as a 3D DVD following a special filming at Sadlers Wells.

In 2005, Winsor appeared in Elle magazine in an eight-page photo special featuring him and Victoria Beckham in the Christmas special edition. Elle Magazine December 2005.

Winsor made his speaking stage acting debut in 2008 with his performance as the monster in Mary Shelley's Frankenstein, directed by Laurie Sampson, at The Royal Playhouse Northampton which earned positive reviews for his athletic and emotional portrayal.

Winsor was educated at Ranby House and Worksop College, Nottinghamshire, before training at the Central School of Ballet from 1998 to 2001 and the Guildhall School of Music and Drama. He toured with Ballet Central during his third year and danced at the Kirov Masterclass at Sadlers Wells under the direction of Irek Mukhamedov. He performed with the Bejart Ballet at Sadlers Wells in Bolero and in One Touch of Venus at the Royal Opera House during his final year at Central before graduating and successfully auditioning for Adventures in Motion Pictures.
