= Crystal Yu =

Hong Kong actress

- Born: Crystal Yu; 1988 or 1989 (age 36–37); Hong Kong
- Occupation: Actress
- Years active: 2003–present
- Website: crystal-yu.com

Crystal Yu is a Hong Kong-British television, film and stage actress. She played Lily Chao on the British BBC medical drama Casualty from 2013 to 2017.

== Life and career ==
Yu, born in Hong Kong, came to London at the age of 11 when she was offered a place at the Elmhurst School of Dance and Performing Arts (formerly known as Elmhurst Ballet School).

As well as acting in theatre, films and TV, she gives up her spare time to work closely with The Royal Academy of Dance and The Jack Petchey Foundation, bringing dance programmes to secondary schools, Special Educational Needs schools and Pupil Referral Units. Yu is fluent in Cantonese, Mandarin and English.

In 2016, Yu was nominated for the Female Actress of the Year honour at the BEAM Awards, an organisation that celebrates minority talent, for her role as Dr. Lily Chao. After four years in Casualty, Yu left the role and her final episode was broadcast on 4 November 2017.

In 2022, she appeared in episodes of Doctor Who and The Sandman. The following year, she appeared as Ms. Cheng in Good Omens.

== Filmography ==
=== Television ===
Year	Title	Role	Notes
2003	Dream Team	Mei	Episode: "Chinese Takeaway"
2007	Diamond Geezer	Ping	Episode: "Old School Lies"
2010	Casualty	Mingmei Ducheng	Episode: "The Enemy Within"
2010	Spirit Warriors	Jiao	Episode: "The Snake Spirit"
2013–2017	Casualty	Lily Chao	Series Regular
2019	Chimerica	Mary Chang	Episode: "Gray Areas"
2019	Keeping Faith	Dr. Sarah Collins	1 episode
2020	Soulmates	Lenora	Episode: "Watershed"
2022	Silverpoint	Charlotte	2 episodes
2022	Doctor Who	Ching Shih	Episode: "Legend of the Sea Devils"
2022	The Sandman	Jackie	Episode: "Imperfect Hosts"
2022	History Of A Pleasure Seeker	Zhen Zhao / Ichika Satyo	Pilot
2023	Good Omens	Ms. Cheng	2 episodes
2024	Sister Boniface Mysteries	Jean Pettifer	Episode: "A Beautiful World"
2026	Avatar: The Last Airbender	Poppy Beifong	3 episodes

=== Film ===
Year	Title	Role	Notes
2008	Car Jack	Club Singer	
2010	Shanghai	Lili	
2011	Will	Chinese Newsreader	
2017	Tossing Myself Off	Galaxy Agent	
2017	Another Man's Shoes	Kitchen Porter	
2019	Weave Wars	Arcadia	
2019	Barney	Woman	
2019	A Christmas Prince: The Royal Baby	Lynn	
2021	Dancing Through the Shadow	Chun	
2021	Permission	Rebecca	
2022	DEUS: The Dark Sphere	Tez Turreau	
2023	The One Note Man	Conductor	2024 Oscar Shortlist Live Action Short Film
2024	Sunrise	Yan Loi	

=== Video games ===
Year	Title	Role	Notes/Ref.
2023	Diablo IV	Additional Voices	
2024	Apex Legends	Alter	
2025	Duet Night Abyss	Fushu	
