= Patrick Robinson (actor) =

British actor (born 1963)

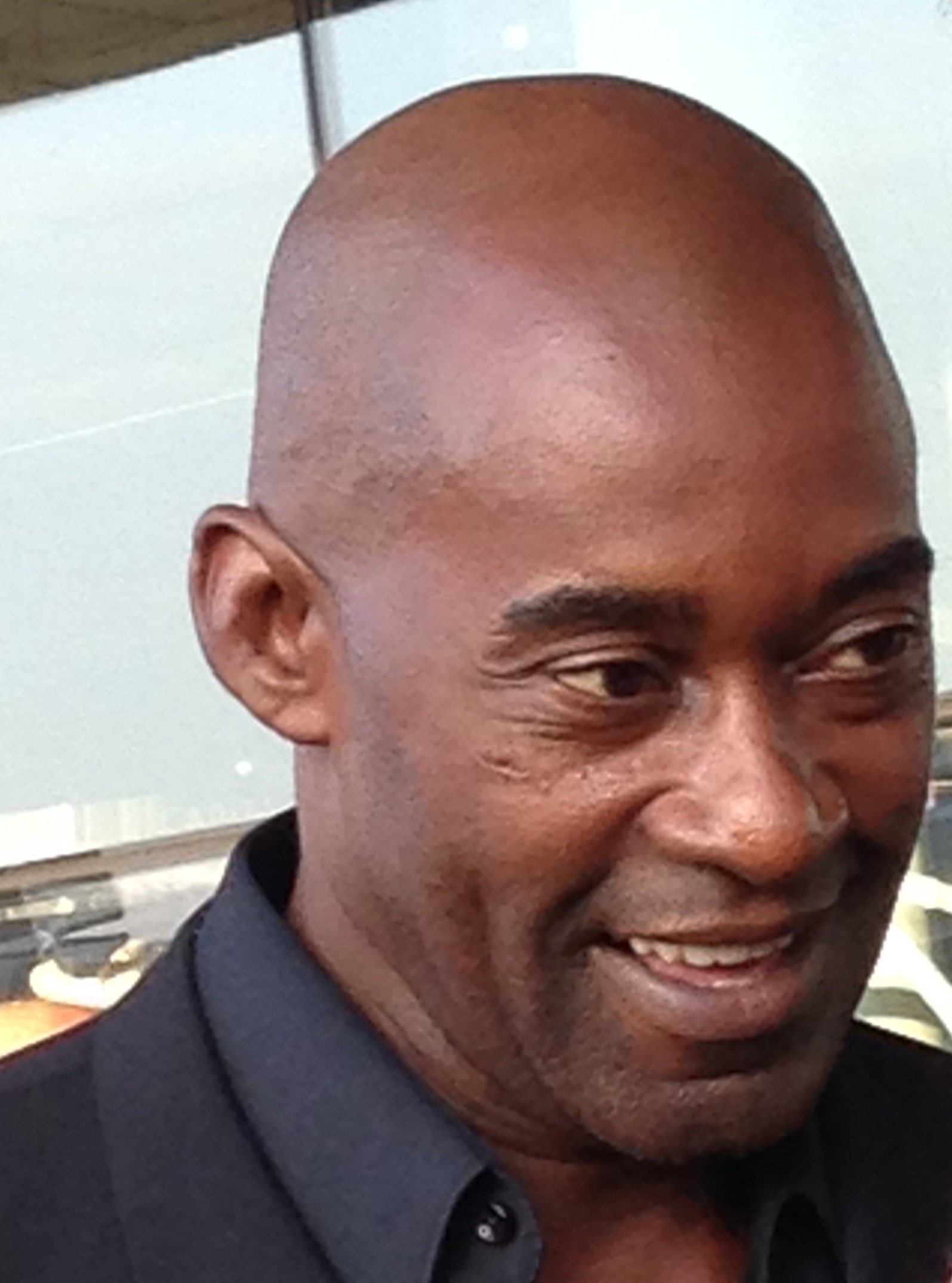
- Robinson in 2013
- Born: 6 November 1963 (age 62); London, England
- Education: London Academy of Music and Dramatic Art
- Occupation: Actor
- Years active: 1990–present
- Children: 4
- Relatives: Ian Wright (cousin)

Patrick Robinson (born 6 November 1963) is a British actor best known for his work in the long-running medical drama series Casualty on BBC One. He played Martin "Ash" Ashford who was, in the early years of the show, a staff nurse and then a charge nurse. In later years, he returned to the role after Ashford had become a consultant.

== Early life ==
Robinson was the fifth of seven children born to a Jamaican-immigrant electrician father and his English-born wife. Robinson joined the South East London School Drama Group aged 14. The cousin of footballer and TV personality Ian Wright, Robinson was offered a trial at Southampton F.C., which he turned down to attend additional drama classes.

After studying architecture for a year, he left to join the Robert Stigwood organisation as a messenger boy. He then graduated from the London Academy of Music and Dramatic Art.

== Career ==
On graduation, he started his career in theatre, and then joined the Royal Shakespeare Company (RSC), spending two seasons in Stratford-upon-Avon and then two in London.

Robinson left the RSC to join the cast of Casualty as the character Martin "Ash" Ashford, a nurse, beginning in 1990. He left the series but returned in 2013–14 to reprise the Ashford role as a Consultant. He returned to Casualty in 2016 as part of the anniversary celebrations.

Robinson played CIA agent Leon Washington in the 2003 action film Belly of the Beast, alongside Steven Seagal.

Robinson appeared in an episode in the last series of the popular CBBC drama The Story of Tracy Beaker as Crash Daniels's abusive father Theo.

In late 2007, Robinson played former slave Thomas Peters who went on to become a leader in Sierra Leone, in a stage adaptation of Rough Crossings by historian Simon Schama at the Liverpool Playhouse.

From 2008, Robinson appeared as Detective Constable Jacob Banks in the ITV police drama The Bill. In 2009, he participated in Let's Dance for Comic Relief with Lisa Maxwell dancing a routine based on Riverdance.

In March 2011, he was appearing as a German cavalry officer "Friedrich" in the New London Theatre production of War Horse.

In 2013, Robinson participated in the eleventh series of Strictly Come Dancing. His dance partner was Anya Garnis, a new professional dancer that year. They were voted out in the semi-final. He played Gregory Brantner in Schooled for Murder, a two-part episode of Midsomer Murders (2013, S15). In September 2015, he joined series 5 of Sky 1's Mount Pleasant as Policeman Cameron Miller, and returned for series 6 in September 2016. In March 2020, he played Marcus Ormansby, a novelist, in The Trouble with Maggie Cole, an ITV drama with Dawn French. In June 2020, Robinson played Anthony Bryan in Sitting in Limbo, a feature-length factual BBC One drama about the Windrush scandal. In January 2021, he guest-starred in Death in Paradise (S10:E1) as TV host Garfield Tourné. Robinson played Father Benedict in Season 5 of The Last Kingdom, in 2022.

In 2022, he played suspect Lloyd Anderson in series 7 of Shetland.

In 2023, he played Jacob Livingstone in series 3 of Sister Boniface Mysteries.

In 2024, he plays Sean in series 3 of the BBC’s comedy Outlaws.

== Personal life ==
Robinson and his wife have three daughters and one son. The family lives in Stratford-upon-Avon.

A supporter of football club Arsenal F.C., where his cousin Ian Wright played, Robinson has played regularly for the club's ex-pro and celebrity team. He also plays street hockey with the Ashmead Cruisers, a team that he co-founded in 1980. The team was the runner-up in the national street hockey tournament twice in the 1980s.
