= Casualty series 32 =

Thirty-second series of Casualty

Casualty
- Series 32
- Starring: William Beck; Jamie Davis; Jason Durr; Lloyd Everitt; Michelle Fox; Jaye Griffiths; Chelsea Halfpenny; Amanda Henderson; Maddy Hill; Tony Marshall; Amanda Mealing; Neet Mohan; Azuka Oforka; George Rainsford; Charlotte Salt; Michael Stevenson; Cathy Shipton; Derek Thompson; Charles Venn; Crystal Yu
- No. of episodes: 44

Release
- Original network: BBC One; BBC One HD
- Original release: 19 August 2017 – 4 August 2018

Series chronology
- ← Previous; Series 31 Next → Series 33

The thirty-second series of the British medical drama television series Casualty commenced airing in the United Kingdom on BBC One on 19 August 2017 and finished on 4 August 2018. The series consisted of 44 episodes. Erika Hossington continued her role as series producer, however, following her resignation in August 2017, was replaced by Lucy Raffety. Simon Harper began his role as the show's executive producer.

Twenty cast members reprised their roles from the previous series. Lloyd Everitt, Crystal Yu, Jamie Davis left their respective roles during the series, while Charlotte Salt reprised her role as Sam Nicholls from episode five onwards. Four new cast members also joined the drama in series 32. The series opened with a two-parter special set in northern France, which was followed by an extended 70-minute special episode. It is the first series in the history of the show to omit episode titles.

== Production ==
The thirty-second series will consist of 44 episodes. Erika Hossington continued her role as series producer, while Simon Harper began his role as executive producer following his appointment in June 2017. Mark Catley, the show's story consultant, was credited as co-executive producer for the opening two episodes, before moving into the role of series executive consultant from episode 3 onwards. In August 2017, it was confirmed that Hossington had resigned from her role and Lucy Raffety, who has worked on the show since 2007, would be replacing her as series producer. Raffety's first credited episode aired on 4 November 2017, while Hossington's final credited episode aired on 9 December 2017.

Former executive producer, Oliver Kent, revealed on 5 August 2016 that the show's production team had planned storylines for the beginning of series 32. Series 32 was officially confirmed on 30 July 2017, with the announcement of a two-part opener special, set in northern France. The special, which was filmed in Fishguard and Cardiff, featured Dylan, David, Louise and Alicia offering their medical talents at a refugee camp. In the special, Dylan bonded with a 12-year-old, Sanosi, and his sister, Mariam. It was reported Dylan was to "[find] himself in a difficult situation over their future". Beck enjoyed not filming on-set and was proud to portray the story, commenting, "The main thing however was the importance of telling this story, which has been slightly forgotten in the news recently, and realising, when you boil it down to one human story, just how relevant it still is." It was also announced that episode 3 of the series would be an extended special, lasting 70 minutes and would feature the results from the inquest into Scott's death.

On 7 September 2017, Sophie Dainty of Digital Spy interviewed Raffety, who confirmed that the show had ceased to use episode titles. She explained that the task of creating titles is "incredibly difficult", which could be proven by the number of reused titles and opined that they made the show feel "dated". Raffety went on to reveal that the show will be airing a "very big, very current, very topical and quite controversial story" as of spring 2018, which will culminate in the series finale. Raffety added that the storyline has divided the crew and the cast, and that the build-up to the end of the series would be "very different in feel". On 9 May 2018, it was announced that episodes broadcast in August 2018 would feature a motorway crash and a petrol tanker turning on its side. The scenes are billed as "unmissable", "dramatic" and "shocking", and were filmed in Yate in Bristol.

On 8 December 2017, Casualty released a trailer previewing storylines airing in Winter, including Connie's battle with a heart tumour, Dylan's alcoholism, Ethan's promotion to clinical lead and an acid attack. The trailer also displayed the return of Zoe Hanna and the guest appearances of Jac Naylor and Sally Hodge. Tom Chapman of Digital Spy also noted that "there is a warming winter glow of festive spirit interspersed between the trials and tribulations of the ED." On 10 May 2018, it was announced that a new storyline, featuring Alicia being raped by Eddie, would begin in May and continue for six weeks. The show worked with Rape Crisis England and Wales for the storyline. Halfpenny felt "a distinct sense of responsibility" for the story and believed that the show had portrayed the story accurately. Katie Russell, working for Rape Crisis, hoped that the story would help detract from the idea that rape is taboo. She added, "Casualty has made efforts to explore this topic responsibly and carefully".

== Cast ==
=== Overview ===
The thirty-second series of Casualty features a cast of characters working in the emergency department of Holby City Hospital. The majority of the cast from the previous series return to this series. Amanda Mealing reprises her role as Connie Beauchamp, clinical lead and consultant in emergency medicine and cardiothoracic surgeon. William Beck and Jaye Griffiths continue as consultants Dylan Keogh and Elle Gardner. George Rainsford portrays specialty registrar Ethan Hardy, who is later promoted to consultant and acting clinical lead, while Crystal Yu plays speciality registrar Lily Chao. Chelsea Halfpenny appears as Alicia Munroe, a doctor undergoing the second year of foundation training and later a specialty registrar in emergency medicine. Charles Venn portrays clinical nurse manager Jacob Masters, who later resigns to become a senior staff nurse, whilst Derek Thompson stars as senior charge nurse and emergency nurse practitioner Charlie Fairhead, who later becomes clinical nurse manager. Cathy Shipton appears as sister, who later becomes senior sister, and senior midwife Lisa "Duffy" Duffin, while Amanda Henderson, Azuka Oforka and Jason Durr play staff nurses Robyn Miller, Louise Tyler and David Hide. Michael Stevenson and Lloyd Everitt star as paramedics Iain Dean and Jez Andrews. Tony Marshall and Jamie Davis appear as receptionist Noel Garcia and porter Max Walker respectively. Emily Carey, Lucy Benjamin, Mitch Hewer and Will Austin also appear as Grace Beauchamp-Strachan, Denise Ellisson, Mickey Ellisson and Scott Ellisson in a recurring capacity.

Following their cameo appearance in episode one, Carey confirmed that they had left the series. Everitt and Hewer made unannounced departures in episode two as their characters left Holby. On his departure, Everitt commented, "By the end of his journey, I discovered more sides to him, which were important to play." Hewitt said he had "the most incredible time" filming with the serial. Benjamin also made her final appearance in the episode, as confirmed by Dafydd Llewelyn, a show producer. Austin made his final appearance in the following episode. Digital Spy announced on 31 October 2017 that Yu would leave the show after four years in the role of Lily Chao. Speaking of her departure, Yu admitted that it was her decision to leave as she has "been away from home for four years", although she added that she had "been offered another year on her contract". Yu departed in episode 11, on 4 November 2017. Davis' final scenes as Max Walker were broadcast in episode 19, broadcast on 13 January 2018. The actor said he enjoyed his exit storyline.

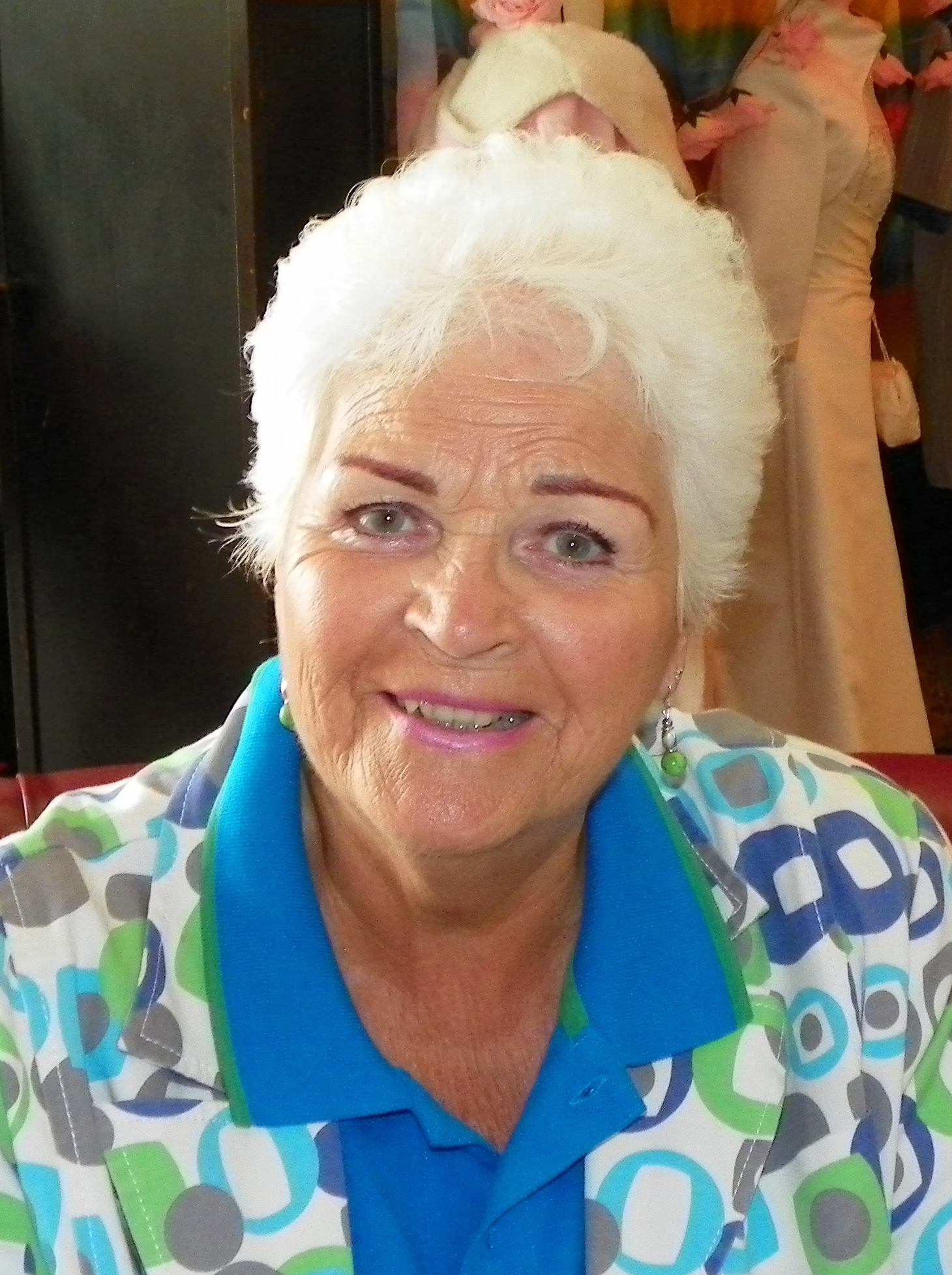
Pam St. Clement appeared in one episode as Sally Hodge.

It was announced on 25 April 2017, that actress Charlotte Salt would be reprising her role as Sam Nicholls as part of a "big storyline" airing later in the year. Salt last appeared on the show between 2011 and 2013, and began filming at the end of May 2017. Sam was originally planned to return on 16 September 2017, but instead returned a week later, in episode 5. Following several guest appearances in the previous series, Ian Bleasdale also returned during the series as ambulance operational manager Josh Griffiths, who originally appeared in the serial between 1989 and 2007. Josh returned in episode 5. Producer Lucy Raffety announced that Sunetra Sarker would be returning as Zoe Hanna for one episode in early 2018, following her departure in series 30. Sarker appeared in episode 19, broadcast on 13 January 2018. Recurring cast member Owain Arthur reprised his role as Glen Thomas, the former fiancé of Robyn, in episode 13. He departs in episode 30, after his cancer returns. Pam St. Clement also reprised her role as Sally Hodge in episode 17, for one episode. Rebecca Ryan reprises her role as Gemma Dean, the sister of Iain, in a recurring capacity from episode 24.

On 15 August 2017, it was confirmed that Rosie Marcel would appear in two episodes as her Holby City character, consultant cardiothoracic surgeon Jac Naylor, during the series. Marcel appeared in episode 24 when Ethan asked Jac for help with the performance of the ED. Three episodes later, Marcel reappeared when Jac told tell Ethan that he must uncover the secret blogger's identity. Raffety confirmed that there would be further crossovers between Casualty and Holby City throughout the series. Guy Henry made a voiceover appearance as his Holby City character, Henrik Hanssen, in episode 17. Marcus Griffiths appears in episode 33 as his Holby City character, Xavier "Zav" Duval.

It was announced on 30 July 2017 that actress Sharon Gless would appear in one episode during the series as Zsa Zsa Harper-Jenkinson, the former mentor of Dylan and "a maestro of surgery". Gless called Zsa Zsa "a wonderful character" who she enjoyed playing. She appeared in episode 13. The character of Rash Masum, an F1 doctor, was announced on 11 August 2017; Neet Mohan was cast in the role. Rash first appears in episode 11. The character of Bea, an F1 doctor, was confirmed by Raffety in an interview with Sophie Dainty of Digital Spy. Raffety said Bea is "full of fiest, and full of guts", but suggested that she could change. Producers were still casting the role at the time of the interview. On 3 October 2017, Ben Dowell of Radio Times announced that Michelle Fox had been cast as the character, revealed to be called Bea Kinsella, who is billed as "gutsy and ambitious". Fox made her first on-screen appearance on 3 February 2018. Advanced spoilers for episode 44 confirmed that Bea would depart in the episode. On 17 January 2018, it was reported that Maddy Hill would be joining the cast as paramedic Ruby Spark in Summer 2018. Hill began filming in February and expressed her delight at joining the show, commenting, "Ruby is like no one I've ever played before." She will make her first appearance in episode 41. In a March 2018 TVTimes interview with Raffety, it was announced that Di Botcher had joined the cast as paramedic and operational duty manager Jan Jenning. Jan is billed as "bold, brash and bossy", which makes her clash with her colleagues. Botcher first appears in episode 35, first broadcast on 19 May 2018. After appearing in episode 28 for one episode, actor Joe Gaminara joined the cast as F1 doctor Eddie McAllister in episode 33. Dainty of Digital Spy dubbed him "a competitive, cocky posh boy – willing to do whatever it takes to climb the career ladder" and suggested that he had a "darker side". Cassie Bradley made her first appearance as Leigh-Anne Carr, the mother of Scott's child, in episode 31. Rainsford confirmed that he would be involved in a new storyline for Ethan and would feature in several episodes. She made her last appearance in episode 40.

=== Main characters ===
- William Beck as Dylan Keogh
- Jamie Davis as Max Walker (until episode 19)
- Jason Durr as David Hide
- Lloyd Everitt as Jez Andrews (until episode 2)
- Michelle Fox as Bea Kinsella (episodes 22−44)
- Jaye Griffiths as Elle Gardner
- Chelsea Halfpenny as Alicia Munroe
- Amanda Henderson as Robyn Miller
- Maddy Hill as Ruby Spark (from episode 41)
- Tony Marshall as Noel Garcia
- Amanda Mealing as Connie Beauchamp
- Neet Mohan as Rash Masum (from episode 11)
- Azuka Oforka as Louise Tyler
- George Rainsford as Ethan Hardy
- Charlotte Salt as Sam Nicholls (from episode 5)
- Cathy Shipton as Lisa "Duffy" Duffin
- Michael Stevenson as Iain Dean
- Derek Thompson as Charlie Fairhead
- Charles Venn as Jacob Masters
- Crystal Yu as Lily Chao (until episode 11)

=== Recurring characters ===
- Owain Arthur as Glen Thomas (episodes 13−30)
- Will Austin as Scott Ellisson
- Lucy Benjamin as Denise Ellisson
- Cassie Bradley as Leigh-Anne Carr
- Di Botcher as Jan Jenning (from episode 35)
- Emily Carey as Grace Beauchamp-Strachan
- Finney Cassidy as Miles Ashworth
- Joe Gaminara as Eddie McAllister
- Roger Griffiths as Marty Williams
- Mitch Hewer as Mickey Ellisson
- Tut Nyout as Sanosi Jemal
- Rebecca Ryan as Gemma Dean (from episode 24)
- Kai Thorne as Blake Gardner

=== Guest characters ===
- Sasha Behar as Alex Broadhurst
- Lin Blakley as Maggie Coomes
- Ian Bleasdale as Josh Griffiths
- Nicholas Boulton as Simon Feathering
- John Paul Connolly as Dougie Kinsella
- Sharon Gless as Zsa Zsa Harper-Jenkinson
- Marcus Griffiths as Xavier "Zav" Duval
- Jenny Howe as Lexy Morrell
- Ariel Ivo Reid as Tara Jewkes
- Gary Lilburn as Ray Coomes
- Rosie Marcel as Jac Naylor
- Amy Noble as DC Wilkinson
- Sunetra Sarker as Zoe Hanna
- Pam St. Clement as Sally Hodge
- James Wilby as Archie Grayling

== Episodes ==
No. overall	No. in series	Episode	Directed by	Written by	Original release date	UK viewers (millions)
1050	1	Episode 1	Steve Brett	Dana Fainaru	19 August 2017	4.99
Dylan, David, Louise and Alicia travel to Calais to help out at a refugee camp. Whilst travelling, they are called to an emergency, where several refugees have been washed ashore. Dylan treats a young boy, Sanosi, and his sister, Mariam. When the trio return to camp, Dylan tells Sanosi he has an unhealed fracture to his leg, which requires rest. David organises a cricket match for the children, but as the refugees return to the camp, Dylan notices his wallet is missing. He finds it in Sanosi's possession, and presumes he was stealing it. Sanosi and Mariam escape the refugee camp with other refugees and get transported to a shipping container, but as a crane lifts the container, the chains snap and refugees fall out. Mariam and Sanosi hang on to the container door to avoid falling, but Mariam falls and dies while Dylan attempts to save them. At the ED, Connie discovers that Sam has taken Grace back to America, devastating her. She works with Ethan on a patient claiming to suffer abdominal pains. They discover she has had an ectopic pregnancy.
1051	2	Episode 2	Steve Brett	Dominique Moloney	26 August 2017	5.02
Robyn and Charlotte's lives are unintentionally endangered when a burning bottle is thrown through their window as Jez is targeted for dating Mickey. Jez manages to escape the house fire, however Robyn and Charlotte are stuck in the living room. Jez returns inside to save Robyn and Charlotte, but as Robyn attempts to hand Charlotte to Jez, he freezes, as recent events continue to play on his mind. Iain believes Jez was targeted in the house fire, and it is later revealed that Denise was responsible for the fire. She is arrested. Mickey encourages Jez to leave the UK for a new life with him. In Calais, Dylan grows increasingly annoyed at the lack of aid he is able to provide the refugees with. By the end of the day, Dylan and David leave Calais, with Sanosi hidden in the back of the emergency vehicle. Alicia and Louise help the female refugees. When female refugees from the camp begin going missing, Alicia learns they are being trafficked, and puts herself in danger trying to save them.
1052	3	Episode 3	James Larkin	Laura Poliakoff	2 September 2017	4.81
Dylan keeps Sanosi on his boathouse to avoid him being seen by the public. When Dylan hears someone shouting for help, he leaves the boathouse unattended, with Sanosi still on it. Dylan later falls through the floor of a dilapidated boat and requests David's help in saving him. As the pair help one another, Sanosi flees the boathouse, having been spotted by Dylan's neighbour. Sanosi later returns to the boathouse and hides. David reveals he has found Sanosi's uncle's phone number. At the ED, Connie reveals to Ethan that Scott Ellisson's death has been classified as an accidental death. Ethan struggles to reject responsibility for letting Scott die, and attempts to hand in his resignation to Connie. Connie learns that Ethan let Scott die, but agrees to ignore what she has learnt to allow Ethan to continue working. Iain and Lily attend Lily's cousin's wedding, but Lily's Aunt Ling is disappointed in Lily for missing the ceremony. Lily later declares her love for Iain when Aunt Ling explains how she still wishes for Lily to become a surgeon.
1053	4	Episode 4	James Larkin	Tony Higgins	16 September 2017	4.92
Dylan contacts Sanosi's uncle, Kamal, and arranges to meet him with Sanosi at a block of flats where he lives. Dylan says a final goodbye to Sanosi, and returns to the ED, relieved that Sanosi is finally reunited with his family, that is until Kamal is admitted to the ED with severe abdominal pains. X-rays show Kamal has swallowed bags of heroin. The police are informed and Kamal is arrested, forcing Dylan to take Sanosi back into his care. Alicia decides it is time for her to learn to drive. Elle takes her out for a lesson, but as a lady opens her car door, Alicia crashes into it. Lily aims to expose her and Iain's relationship, but struggles to find a way to tell her colleagues. She later calls on a meeting in the staff room, where she makes an awkward reveal. Connie takes Ethan under her care following his attempt to resign.
1054	5	Episode 5	Paul Riordan	Kayleigh Llewellyn	23 September 2017	5.95
Sam Nicholls returns to Holby City, alongside Josh, who is acting as Sam's superior for her first few shifts as a paramedic. Iain is surprised upon Sam's return, and questions her over her transition from a registrar to a paramedic, to which she later reveals was the result of her career as a registrar being destroyed by whistleblowing about patient safety and overcrowding in the previous hospital she worked at. Iain further questions Sam over Tom's whereabouts; she tells him she has split up with Tom. Lily grows uneasy upon learning Sam cheated on Dylan with Iain. Sam threatens her career on her first shift as she goes against protocol on a patient, but her career is saved by Dylan, who covers for her. Connie's concerns towards her own health begin to play on her mind. She takes a blood pressure reading in her office, but is disturbed by Lily. Elle evaluates her love life and joins a dating website when Alicia learns she has not had sex in five years.
1055	6	Episode 6	Paul Riordan	Oliver Frampton	30 September 2017	5.77
Connie attends a private clinic where she undergoes several cardiothoracic scans, following concerns for her health. After the scans, Connie throws herself into work by treating a couple of former drug dealers who are admitted after a wall collapses onto them. Secrets about the couple's drug habits are soon exposed, and Connie finds herself among the drama, until her doctor informs her he has the results of her cardio scans. Upon attending her meeting, Connie learns she has a heart tumour. Further tests are taken to determine whether the tumour is benign or malignant. Connie decides not to inform her colleagues of her news, but asks Ethan to interpret her scans, pretending they are a patient's. Elle treats a young patient with a knife in her arm. Alicia notices the patient's father could potentially be a date for Elle, and so decides to intervene and encourage Elle to ask him on a date.
1056	7	Episode 7	Carolina Giammetta	Claire Miller	7 October 2017	5.80
Connie receives her PET scan results; they show signs of malignancy. Understanding she will need an operation, Connie panics when she realises that if she remains at Holby for treatment, she will be operated on by Jac Naylor. She considers private treatment, but following an eventful shift at work involving a deaf patient and her pushy mother, Connie later decides to refuse any treatment. David and Dylan are forced to bring Sanosi into the ED when Sanosi falls from a ladder and hurts his ankle and head after fleeing the boathouse. Louise attempts to help David and Dylan, but when their story about Sanosi does not add up, Louise hooks on that something is not right, and looks through photos on Alicia's phone from France, making a realisation. Alicia begins driving lessons with an instructor. Elle fears she has messed up her chances of a relationship after her second date.
1057	8	Episode 8	Carolina Giammetta	Sarah Beeson	14 October 2017	5.85
Connie begins suffering an intermittent loss of sensation in her dominant hand, a sign of a blood clot. Connie uses Ethan to her advantage once again by quizzing him about the signs and symptoms her pretend patient is displaying, that is until Ethan realises that Connie is the real patient. Ethan tells Connie she needs an operation and prepares to get a specialist, but before he can, Connie reminds Ethan that she knows he let Scott Ellisson die, and blackmails Ethan into performing the operation on Connie himself. Ethan does, and Connie is satisfied. Alicia prepares to take her driving test, but in her final lesson before her test, she accidentally runs over her driving instructor's foot. Despite this, Alicia passes her driving test. Lily grows interested in a research opportunity the hospital is offering, and secretly applies, without telling Iain.
1058	9	Episode 9	John Greening	Matthew Barry	21 October 2017	6.12
Dylan prepares to leave his boathouse for work, but is confronted by Louise, who walks on into Dylan's boathouse and discovers Sanosi is living there. Louise finds herself conflicted about Dylan and David's actions, and when Connie informs Dylan that Social Services have gotten involved in the incident, Dylan accuses Louise of phoning them. As David, Dylan and Louise argue on the wards, it becomes evident something is wrong, and Connie intervenes. At the end of her shift Connie visits Dylan's boathouse. Louise takes Sanosi from Dylan's before Connie arrives, and allows him to stay at hers. Lily heads out with Sam and Iain for the day as an observer and grows jealous of the pair's friendship. At the ED, Lily is informed she has been offered the research opportunity. She initially rejects the offer, but later accepts it after an argument with Iain. She is informed the project is abroad. Max helps Tara, the mortuary assistant, reach a realisation about her relationship with her drug addicted boyfriend.
1059	10	Episode 10	John Greening	Kim Millar	28 October 2017	5.73
Louise tells Dylan she cannot keep Sanosi at her house, and a decision needs to be made over his future. A torn Dylan arrives at the ED for his shift. He works alongside David to treat a patient who was placed in foster care by her mother in order to protect her from her abusive partner. After treating the patient, Dylan realises that he needs to do what is right, and takes Sanosi to the police station. Sanosi is disappointed by Dylan, but tells Dylan he will not report him, David or Louise to the police for smuggling him into the UK. Elle wakes up in bed with Marty after a romantic night together. Marty later arrives at the ED desperately seeking Elle's help, complaining of a burning sensation in his penis. Elle suspects an STI, until Jacob notices Marty suffering anaphylaxis from chilli powder sprinkled on his clothing. Jacob learns one of Elle's children was responsible for the prank, and forces them to apologise. Elle decides she is happy with Marty, and they begin a relationship.
1060	11	Episode 11	Matthew Evans	Jeff Povey	4 November 2017	6.03
Lily prepares herself for her pitch in order to secure a place on the research project in Hong Kong. Just moments before she is called into the board room, Iain declares his love for Lily, and tells her how happy he is. Lily becomes distracted by this, and messes her pitch up. Despite this, she is offered a place on the project. Lily is torn between choosing Hong Kong or Iain; she ultimately chooses her career, and leaves Iain, and Holby City, behind her. New F1 doctor, Rashid Masum, begins his first shift at the ED. He is called out to the scene of a car crash to observe the situation, but his eagerness to get involved results in Iain injuring himself. Rashid feels as though he has messed up, but is supported by David and his colleagues, who help him get through the day.
1061	12	Episode 12	Matthew Evans	Simon Norman	11 November 2017	6.16
Ethan fears his secret is out when he finds a note in his locker informing him that someone knows what he has done. Unaware the note was from Max, who jokingly put it in there after Ethan stole a piece of pizza, Ethan prepares to hand himself into the police when they arrive at the ED following the shooting of a male at an armed siege. Connie intercepts Ethan's attempt of confessing, and tells him that he has a promising future ahead of him, and could well become the next clinical lead, should he continue to work at Holby and not hand himself in. Alicia mentors Rash, but has to discipline him when he nearly administers potassium to a patient instead of saline. Rash is distressed by his error, but David helps Rash realise he is a capable doctor. Robyn plans a christening for Charlotte.
1062	13	Episode 13	Jordan Hogg	Mark Catley	18 November 2017	5.66
Robyn delightedly prepares for Charlotte's christening, but when she walks into the staff room, she is left speechless upon seeing Glen in the room. In a series of flashbacks, it is revealed that back in episode 1026, Dylan stumbles across Glen whilst searching for Charlie. Dylan takes a drunken Glen back to his flat and tells him he is confused as to how Glen is still alive, following his diagnosis of a terminal brain tumour back in episode 1012. Glen tells Dylan he is prepared to die at any minute, but Dylan contacts pioneering and world-leading brain surgeon Zsa Zsa Harper-Jenkinson, who trained Dylan up as a consultant years ago. Zsa Zsa explains that she could perform a risky operation on Glen, which has a fifty per cent chance of killing him. Glen agrees to the operation, and survives, with most of his tumour being removed. As the time for Charlotte's christening arrives, Glen asks to be invited. Robyn reluctantly allows Glen to join in the christening, but makes it clear he has a lot of making up to do.
1063	14	Episode 14	Jordan Hogg	Asher Pirie	25 November 2017	5.50
Connie attends her first session of chemotherapy. Reluctant to let Ethan stay with her, Connie informs Ethan that she is giving him the role of acting clinical lead for the day. Ethan attempts to prove himself in the role, but his desire for the ED to run perfectly in Connie's absence results in a backlog of patients in reception, staff nurses taking on additional roles, and patients on beds in corridors. The situation is worsened when one of Ethan's patients steals a rapid response vehicle and crashes it into an office opposite the ED, in a desperate attempt to get away from the hospital. Overwhelmed by the events, Duffy supports Ethan and encourages him to sort the hospital out. Glen is employed as a porter in the ED, which irritates Max. Max abandons Glen throughout his shift, in hopes that he will leave, but has little success. When Glen helps an addicted priest seek help, Max realises he may have been too harsh, and apologises. Dylan buys himself more alcohol on his way home.
1064	15	Episode 15	Roberto Bangura	Steve Bailie	2 December 2017	5.09
Connie returns to the ED following her chemotherapy session. Her hair begins to fall out so she rearranges it to prevent her colleagues from noticing. Charlie grows concerned for Connie when he notices she is looking unwell; he expresses his concerns to Connie but she ignores him. Then, Ethan advises that Connie leaves work to prevent herself from getting an infection, but Connie rejects Ethan's advice as well, and continues to work. A male is admitted with an unexploded flare in his leg following an explosion at a hidden meth lab, and so Connie works alongside Alicia and Duffy to remove the device before it explodes. After her shift, Connie goes home and begins cutting her hair off. Max notices new barista Polly in the café and begins to like her. He is encouraged by Glen to ask her out to the pub for a drink.
1065	16	Episode 16	Roberto Bangura	Dominique Moloney	9 December 2017	5.28
Elle excitedly makes plans for her first Christmas with Marty and her sons. However, Blake is unhappy by Elle's plans and tells her he will spend it with his father. Blake then meets up with his friends for a party. When the teenagers run out of alcohol, Blake is encouraged to steal from a local shop, but he is caught stealing by the shopkeeper. The shopkeeper and Blake scuffle which results in the shopkeeper being shoved into a wall and the bottle Blake has stolen smashing in his pocket, injuring him. Blake phones Jacob for help, and is taken to the ED for treatment. Elle learns of Blake's theft and is ashamed, but the shopkeeper says he will not take legal action. Blake sees Marty in the ED as angrily fights Marty. Marty fights back, shocking Elle. Following the incident, Elle breaks up with Marty. She later reveals to Jacob that he is Blake's father after trying to avoid Jacob throughout her shift. Jacob is shocked. Rash treats his ex-girlfriend and questions what he really wants in his life. He later realises his heart lies in being a doctor.
1066	17	Episode 17	Julie Edwards	Rebecca Wojciechowski	23 December 2017	5.33
Connie treats Kim, a patient with a stomach ulcer. When Connie catches Kim trying to steal a necklace Grace gave to her, Kim flees the hospital. Connie searches for Kim and finds her in a dilapidated house with her son. Kim coughs up blood and Connie goes to call for help, but she falls through floorboards before she is able to. Sam and Iain eventually arrive and take Connie, Kim, and her son to the ED. There, Connie falls unconscious and goes into atrial fibrillation; Ethan reveals she has a cardiac tumour to the team. Connie is brought back round and is devastated to learn her secret has been exposed. Charlie reassures her that everyone is there for her. She is heartbroken as she phones Grace to tell her she cannot spend Christmas in America with her. Robyn is reluctant to move back into the share house following the fire in episode 1051; she decides to move in with Glen, and give their relationship another go. An elderly patient, Claude Maynard, is brought into the ED by his son, and admitted for tests. After the tests, he is told he can go home, but his family ignore phone calls from the ED and move away, leaving him in the hospital's care. Sally Hodge returns to tell Charlie she no longer has breast cancer – and later forms a friendship with Claude.
1067	18	Episode 18	Julie Edwards	Dana Fainaru	6 January 2018	4.90
Connie is informed by Dr Feathering that her tumour has grown and her present consultant is refusing to operate on her. Connie refuses to accept that her operation will not go ahead, so she makes Ethan take her to London, where she meets a former surgical friend, Professor Cornell, to discuss her condition. Professor Cornell also refuses to operate on Connie. Connie is devastated and confides in Ethan about her condition. Ethan tells Connie he has Huntington's disease. Connie goes to kiss Ethan, but he pulls away; Connie tells Ethan to stay away from her. At her hotel room, Connie falls unconscious in the bath. Professor Cornell agrees to operate on Connie and her tumour is removed. Charlie visits Connie, who tells Charlie to keep Ethan away from her. At the ED, Dylan wakes up hungover from the previous night. He is informed that he is clinical lead in Connie's absence. On his way to work, Dylan accidentally runs down an elderly lady chasing her dog. Dylan fears he is still over the legal alcohol limit to drive, and fears that the patient will report him to the police. He takes a breathalyser and is under the limit. He then manages to help the lady he ran over out.
1068	19	Episode 19	Judith Dine	Matthew Barry & Kelly Jones	13 January 2018	5.16
Max is delighted when he notices old medical school friend James outside the ED. James informs Max that his girlfriend, Aisha, has been admitted and he is waiting for her to be discharged. At the same time, Zoe Hanna visits Holby whilst on her way to Madrid. Zoe finds Max outside the ED and the pair talk. James walks over to Max to say goodbye, but as he does, Aisha has acid thrown in her face and her bag stolen. Duffy notices ligature marks on Aisha's wrists and believes she is being abused. Aisha tells Duffy she is being abused. Max attempts to keep James away from Aisha, but when he learns she is pregnant and in a safe zone, he holds Zoe hostage and threatens to pour acid over her face. Max attempts to calm the situation down, with little success. James goes to pour acid on Zoe's face, but it has been substituted with water. Following her eventful day, Zoe travels the airport. After boarding the plane, Max joins Zoe and tells her he still loves her; they leave for Madrid together. Blake is admitted with a compass embedded in his hand. Jacob notices that Blake is being bullied, and stands up for Blake. Jacob later reveals to Blake that he is his father.
1069	20	Episode 20	Judith Dine	Jerome Bucchan-Nelson & Matthew Barry	20 January 2018	5.05
Elle panics when she walks into Blake's bedroom in the morning to find he has stayed out all night. Blake arrives at the ED with Miles, his bully, who has sustained a serious head injury. Elle treats Miles while Jacob talks to Blake; he learns that Blake is high and was responsible for Miles's injuries. Elle and Jacob argue over Blake's welfare, while Blake is arrested when Miles tells the police that it was an unprovoked attack and Blake was in possession of illegal drugs. Ethan goes for his consultancy interview, and is surprised when Connie is on the panel of judges. He fears he has messed up when he uses Connie as an example of a patient where he has gone beyond his role of a doctor to treat someone, although he is later informed he has been promoted. Dylan quits his role of acting clinical lead and turns to alcohol once more to get through his shift.
1070	21	Episode 21	Fiona Walton	Jon Sen	27 January 2018	5.10
Dylan struggles with his alcoholism when dealing with a sensitive case involving a stabbing victim and her young son in what is suspected to be a domestic abuse case. By the end of his shift, Dylan realises that he needs to get help, so he attends an alcoholics anonymous meeting, although nerves get the better of him as he prepares to walk into the meeting and introduce himself. Ethan is informed by Connie that he is now the ED's acting clinical lead. Ethan's attempts to successfully keep the ED running do not go smoothly as he deals with one disaster after another. Whilst receiving a course of chemotherapy, Connie befriends elderly cancer patient Maggie. Maggie is told her cancer has spread further, and so her husband, Ray, desperately pleas with doctors to pay more money for her treatment. Ray then collapses in his chair and is admitted to the ED. Connie feels sorry for Maggie and Ray, and gives them a cheque to pay for her treatment.
1071	22	Episode 22	Fiona Walton	Michelle Lipton	3 February 2018	5.37
Ethan feels the pressure as clinical lead when the ED runs out of beds and patients are forced to be treated in the corridors and ambulances. Iain is annoyed by the lack of care for a patient on his ambulance. Alicia begins treating the patient in the ambulance, and then learns that he is in sepsis and requires urgent medical treatment, forcing him into an already overcrowded ED. Amidst the commotion, new F1 Bea Kinsella joins the team; she quickly gets herself into trouble when she discusses a patient's details to Rash in front of the patient's relatives. Alicia is slapped by the patient's daughter as stress from everyone in the ED climaxes. At the end of her shift, Alicia anonymously sets up a blog, discussing the appalling situation the hospital, and the NHS, is in.
1072	23	Episode 23	Tracey Larcombe	Dominique Moloney	10 February 2018	5.20
Elle and Jacob attend Blake's court hearing together. Blake pleads guilty to harming Miles. During the hearing, Elle receives a phone call from Alicia, who informs her that Miles has been readmitted to the ED after having a seizure. Fearing that Miles' head injury could be causing his seizures, Elle looks at Miles' notes and brain scans. She identifies that Miles' cannabis usage is causing his collapses, and that he has suffered no long-lasting damage to the brain as a result of Blake. The court are informed and Blake is given a six month referral order. Bea has a one-night stand with a woman and Rash finds out. She learns that Rash is a virgin. Iain and Sam admit an elderly lady who has suffered a fall. They are suspicious by a male with the lady, claiming to be her son. After looking in the male's bag, Iain learns that he has no relation to the patient, and was planning to steal from her.
1073	24	Episode 24	Tracey Larcombe	Jason Sutton	17 February 2018	5.18
Ethan tells Jac he thinks he has found a solution to the beds in corridors problem of the ED by introducing a clinical decisions unit on the ward, which will be run by junior doctors. Jac is unimpressed by Ethan's proposal, aware it will create a further backlog of patients elsewhere. Alicia continues to use her blogging anonymously to expose the weaknesses of the new unit. Patients grow concerned by what they are reading in newspapers and on the blog, leaving Ethan's position as clinical lead vulnerable. He and Alicia begin reconciling after their shift, and share a kiss. It is Gemma's first day as a porter following her release from prison. Jacob warns Gemma that if she messes anything up during her trial shift, she will lose her job immediately. Gemma proves herself to Jacob when a patient goes missing and, going against Jacob's orders of searching for the patient outside, she finds the patient in the basement.
1074	25	Episode 25	Jordan Hogg	Jon Sen	24 February 2018	5.05
Ethan is informed by the hospital administrators that the ED's budget is in a poor state. In a desperate attempt to ease the financial pressure he is under, Ethan closes down the clinical decisions unit and cancels leave for all members of staff. Alicia tries to talk to Ethan, but he brusquely reminds her that whilst they work together, he is her boss. Glen is unhappy that Robyn does not share his surname; he decides to propose to Robyn in the hopes that she will marry him. Robyn provides Glen with some harsh realities about the struggles she has faced with a single mother, so Glen agrees that if the pair get married again, he will take her surname. Robyn agrees and the pair get engaged. Elle looks after a dying elderly patient who is a former Nazi.
1075	26	Episode 26	Jordan Hogg	Steve Bailie	3 March 2018	5.23
Dylan meets Ciara at an alcoholics anonymous meeting. After the meeting, Ciara tries to persuade Dylan to go for a drink with her, but Dylan rejects her, so she takes fellow member Joseph out instead. The next morning, Joseph suffers a hemorrhagic stroke. Ciara and Joseph arrive at the ED; Dylan treats Joseph, but he dies. Ciara is devastated by Joseph's death and tells Bea that Dylan is an alcoholic, before going for another drink. Dylan finds Ciara and encourages her to seek further help for her alcoholism. Dylan becomes more determined to beat his alcoholism, and attends another meeting. Bea is keen to prove her clinical capabilities to Ethan by treating as many patients as possible, but she make a potentially life-threatening mistake. After giving her a talk on getting help when it is needed, Ethan decides to put Bea on a major trauma course. Rash accuses Gemma of stealing his wallet when he leaves it lying around, so Gemma works with the ancillary staff to get revenge.
1076	27	Episode 27	Paul Riordan	Tom McKay & Jeff Povey	10 March 2018	4.93
Jac returns to the ED and informs Ethan that he must identify the anonymous blogger by the end of the day, else he will be fired. Ethan analyses the blogs more thoroughly and concludes that Rash is the blogger, until Alicia reveals to Ethan that she is the blogger. Jac returns and asks Ethan if he knows who the blogger is, Ethan tells her he does, and that he has made a deal with the blogger: they shut the blog down forever and get to keep their job. Alicia is thankful to Ethan for covering her, but he tells her that he wants nothing to do with her anymore. A nervous Rash is placed in Resus. He doubts his capabilities as a doctor under pressure, until he successfully treats a young homeless boy's mother.
1077	28	Episode 28	Paul Riordan	Oliver Frampton	17 March 2018	4.92
Rash treats a prisoner admitted after being stabbed in the thigh. He aggravates the prisoner and is kneed in the face; Dylan takes over the prisoner's treatment, but when Gemma is taken hostage by the prisoner, who bundles her in a car and goes to drive away, Rash jumps on the bonnet of the car. The car is stopped and Rash tells the prisoner he knows why he planned to run off − to go and see his dying relative. Rash cleans Gemma up in cubicles, where they begin to get to know each other. As Gemma prepares to go home, she tells Rash she thinks he is cool. He is thrilled by her remark. Bea goes up against F1 Eddie for the coveted trauma course. During an operation, Eddie asks Bea to take over as his contact lens is giving him grief. Bea does, but a drill bit chips and goes into the patient. When Bea and Eddie go out for a meal in the evening with Ms Broadhurst, the leader of the course, Bea covers for Eddie about the operation events. After the meal, Ms Broadhurst tells Bea she knows what happened, but tells Bea she is still a contender for the course.
1078	29	Episode 29	Amanda Mealing	Jeff Povey	24 March 2018	5.31
Robyn and Glen's wedding day arrives. Glen suffers an absence seizure whilst getting ready, so heads to the ED and seeks Dylan's help. Dylan orders Glen a CT scan which confirms his cancer has returned. Glen keeps quiet over his diagnosis and arrives at the wedding venue, where he marries Robyn. As the pair head off to Devon for their honeymoon, Glen suffers another seizure. Robyn begins turning the car around in the road in order to get Glen to the hospital, but as she does, a van smashes into the side of them. Jacob questions Elle after she orders the morning after pill from the pharmacy following a one-night stand at a conference. Rash treats a patient suffering anxiety in the aftermath of her fiancé's death.
1079	30	Episode 30	Amanda Mealing	Rebecca Wojciechowski	31 March 2018	5.22
Robyn and Glen survive the car crash and are admitted to the ED. Robyn realises that Glen is suffering his seizures again and does not have long left to live. Glen agrees to have another CT scan to assess the situation; he only has days left to live. A neurologist agrees that Glen can have an operation to prolong his life another few months, but when Glen's vision begins to worsen he decides he does not want the operation. Glen's condition rapidly deteriorates and he is placed in a side room with Robyn and Charlotte, where he peacefully passes away. The staff are heartbroken. Bea asks to shadow Dylan, fearing his alcoholism may be affecting his work. She voices her concerns to Sam and as Louise tries to defend Dylan, more members of staff learn of Dylan's alcohol addiction, embarrassing Dylan.
1080	31	Episode 31	Alex Jacob	Laura Poliakoff & Claire Miller	7 April 2018	5.01
Ethan treats pregnant patient Leigh-Anne, who is admitted after her waters break. Leigh-Anne is reluctant to stay at Holby ED, and when Ethan learns that Leigh-Anne is Scott Ellisson's girlfriend, he struggles once again with his emotions. After learning that Leigh-Anne has been evicted from her home, Ethan finds her somewhere else to live for once she has been discharged; he also agrees to visit her. Sam tries to encourage Dylan to go out for a meal with her after work so she can try and rebuild their friendship, but Dylan rejects her suggestion. Bea learns the truth about two friends who have been admitted after they ran over a jogger and then crashed their car. Charlie delights in being promoted back to clinical nurse manager, but Duffy is not impressed by the lack of attention he is paying to their relationship after leaving for work early and staying for a night shift.
1081	32	Episode 32	Alex Jacob	Oliver Frampton	14 April 2018	4.64
Bea treats a pair of robbers who have fallen into a skip while fleeing a botched robbery. Bea also treats the victim of the robbery, but when she gets too involved in the case, she ignores a back wound on one of the robbers she is treating, leading to significant complications and surgery being required. Ethan is furious at Bea for her lack of professionalism and the severity of the error she has made. Bea is taken off her shift. She proceeds to get drunk at a bar, and as she then tries to walk home, she stumbles down an alleyway, trips on a bottle and hits her head against the floor. Bea lies semi-consciously in the alleyway among some bins, with no one around to help her. Leigh-Anne returns to the hospital and Ethan notices her newborn son, Kiegan Scott, has a high temperature. Ethan and Duffy realise Kiegan is suffering with chickenpox, which later develops into pneumonitis. Ethan tells Leigh-Anne he was around Scott hours before he died as the two continue to grow closer.
1082	33	Episode 33	Steve Hughes	Aisling Kiely & Jeff Povey	28 April 2018	4.76
Bea wakes up in an alleyway and is taken to the ED by Iain and Sam. Charlie makes Ethan realise that Bea has been pushed too far, and needs time off, but as Ethan prepares to have a talk with Bea, he is interrupted by Leigh-Anne, who requires his assistance. Bea visits the patient who she caused to have complications from ignoring his back wound, and is confronted by anaesthetist Xavier Duval, who tells her to consider her future at Holby following her error. As Ethan finishes dealing with Leigh-Anne, he goes to focus on Bea, but finds she has handed in her resignation letter and fled. Ethan hands in his resignation as clinical lead, deciding to focus on his new-found friendship with Leigh-Anne. New F1 Eddie McAllister begins working in the ED and is paired up with Alicia. He works with her to treat an autistic patient. Robyn returns to work following Glen's death. Dylan hands her a present which Glen asked Robyn to receive after he died; she opens it and is touched to find it contains memories of her and Glen throughout their relationship.
1083	34	Episode 34	Steve Hughes	Rachel Aird	5 May 2018	4.64
Connie takes back the status of clinical lead of the ED and immediately begins planning the creation of a trauma unit when an elderly man dies in the resuscitation suite because of a lack of operating theatres. Charlie openly disagrees with Connie's plan and vocalises his concerns about how he believes the unit is waste of money. Despite this, Connie prepares the trauma unit, much to Charlie's annoyance. Ethan takes Leigh-Anne and Kiegan to their flat following Kiegan's discharge from hospital. Leigh-Anne struggles to cope with Kiegan when he cries and ends up abandoning him outside the ED. Ethan helps Leigh-Anne realise she is capable of looking after Kiegan, and when a meeting is called regarding her suitability to be a mother to Kiegan, Ethan looks out for Leigh-Anne. Kiegan is returned to Leigh-Anne and Ethan takes them both home. Leigh-Anne and Ethan share a kiss. Alicia moves into her new flat and has a house-warming party.
1084	35	Episode 35	Shaun Evans	Julie Dixon	19 May 2018	4.56
Sam and Iain treat a teenage boy in a storm drain, whose foot has gotten stuck in a drain. They find themselves in a crisis when the storm drain begins filling with water and they are unable to release their patient's foot from the drain. As the water reaches their necks and the fire brigade are unable to remove the drain, Sam makes the decision to amputate the patient's leg. When they return to the ED, Sam feels guilty about the amputation, but accepts it was in their patient's best interest. Jan Jenning, the ambulance station's newest operations duty manager, is unimpressed by Sam and Iain's actions, though she later praises their bravery. Bea returns to Holby when her father is admitted. She tries to avoid her colleagues, but ends up telling Rash about how her parents split up when she was younger, and that she has not seen her mother since.
1085	36	Episode 36	Shaun Evans	Debbie Owen	26 May 2018	4.57
Connie is shocked when Maggie, the cancer patient she befriended during chemotherapy, is admitted to the ED with a bloody head wound. Things take a mysterious turn when Ray, Maggie's husband, is also admitted following an overdose attempt, but also with defence wounds to his hands. It soon transpires that Maggie's cancer has spread to her brain, which caused her to become confused and attack Ray with a knife, resulting in him hitting Maggie over the head with an ornament, and then attempting suicide. Ethan and Alicia agree to be friends again. Ethan pits Bea against Eddie to see who can treat the most patients in a shift. Alicia agrees to be Eddie's mentor for the duration of the shift. After their shift, Alicia and Eddie go to the pub and drink together; they then head back to Alicia's flat.
1086	37	Episode 37	Jon Sen	Jon Sen	2 June 2018	4.37
Alicia wakes in Eddie's bed, distressed. She runs away from her house in the night. The next morning, she avoids Eddie. When a bus crashes, Alicia takes the opportunity to leave the hospital and treat a patient trapped in the bus. After saving the patient and admitting her to the ED, Alicia collapses from mild hypothermia. Ethan questions if Alicia is okay when she is taken off-shift and returns to her home. Alicia tries to talk to Ethan but is unsuccessful, as Ethan assumes she is now dating Eddie and tried to tell him. She breaks down and burns her bedding. Jacob tries to encourage Blake to study for his exams. Leigh-Anne demands that Ethan treats Kiegan after admitting him again.
1087	38	Episode 38	Karen Kelly	Hamish Wright	9 June 2018	4.77
Eddie realises that Alicia is scared of him when he learns she has swapped the shifts they share together to avoid him. He attempts to confront Alicia about what happened on the night he went back to her flat, but she is distressed and hastily walks off. Bea is called away from the hospital to visit her dad, who has been released from custody. She is unimpressed by her father's disrespectful attitude towards his lifestyle and ends up moving out, and in with Alicia. The pair go on a night out to celebrate Bea moving in. Sam and Jacob discuss who she could beat in a boxing match. As Jacob begins getting cocky with Sam, she knocks him to the ground, where he loses consciousness. Once in the ED, Sam and Jacob begin to grow closer.
1088	39	Episode 39	Roberto Bangura	Jess O'Kane & Jeff Povey	16 June 2018	4.59
Connie drags Elle with her to a meeting she has regarding the funding of her trauma centre when Dylan is unable to make it to the meeting with Connie. On their way to the meeting, Connie and Elle stop off at a garage, where a father has taken the worker in the garage hostage. As the father makes his escape from the garage in his car, he accidentally runs over his daughter. Connie and Elle save the daughter's life and eventually make it to the meeting. After the meeting, Elle and Connie share a room for the night in a hotel, and an unlikely friendship forms between the pair. At the ED, Rash and Gem are tasked with looking after Mrs B, Connie's goldfish. Mrs B dies and Rash and Gem learn that Noel killed the goldfish accidentally by spilling his coffee into the tank. David has a criminal doppelgänger in the hospital.
1089	40	Episode 40	Roberto Bangura	Steve Bailie	23 June 2018	4.52
Bea grows concerned for Alicia's wellbeing when she begins to notice that Alicia is behaving differently. Leigh-Anne returns to the ED with Kiegan and requests that Ethan treats him, but when Alicia treats Kiegan instead, Leigh-Anne exposes her relationship with Ethan to Alicia. Leigh-Anne wishes to file a complaint, but Alicia helps change Leigh-Anne's mind. Alicia confronts Ethan about his relationship with Leigh-Anne, which results in Ethan confessing to Alicia that he murdered Scott. A couple crash their car into a shed, which unearths a complex situation about their relationship. Sam is shocked when Blake attempts to kiss her. Robyn asks for overtime to help cover the cost of her car parking fines.
1090	41	Episode 41	Paulette Randall	Michelle Lipton	14 July 2018	4.73
Ruby Spark begins at Holby ED as a paramedic. She starts by treating a drug overdosed patient, but he wakes up as she attempts to give him medication and punches her. Her day does not get any easier when she then performs CPR on a patient with a DNR and successfully revives the patient. Iain and Sam are unimpressed by Ruby, but Jan tells Ruby that her colleagues will not hold anything against her, and that she must get back out in the ambulance and move on. At the ED, Alicia's anger reaches its peak when Eddie attempts to undermine her whilst she tells a patient he may be paralysed. Bea picks up on Alicia's aggression around Eddie and tells Alicia to talk to her; Alicia tells Bea she was raped by Eddie. At the same time, Bea is offered a place on a trauma course in Paris. Noel decides to celebrate the NHS's 70th anniversary with stickers.
1091	42	Episode 42	Paulette Randall	Oliver Frampton	21 July 2018	4.53
Alicia and Bea visit a sexual assault clinic. Alicia tells the counsellor that she is trying to find new techniques to help sexual assault patients come forward, and uses her situation as a hypothetical scenario. After a tormenting shift with Eddie, who tries to befriend Alicia and encourage her to put the past behind them, Alicia breaks down and visits the counsellor again with Bea, this time telling her the hypothetical scenario is the situation that she is in. Ruby attempts to work on her awkward personality during her shift with Sam, but once again fails to impress her. Jan asks Sam if she needs to transfer Ruby elsewhere, but Sam later has a change of heart. Jacob lies to Sam and tells her that Blake knows about their relationship. Rash continues to awkwardly chase Gem around the ED.
1092	43	Episode 43	Fiona Walton	Hamish Wright	28 July 2018	5.09
Alicia is feeling more positive following her counselling session, and tries to move on with her life. Bea tries to remain supportive towards Alicia, but she struggles to hide her disappointment towards Alicia when she tells Bea she will not report Eddie to the police. Bea later tries to convince Alicia to report Eddie, which leads to Alicia slapping Bea. Alicia later realises she needs to report Eddie and drives to the police station. Connie is delighted at the opening of her new trauma theatre, and a couple involved in a car crash provides the perfect opportunity to use it. Rash gets dating advice from Eddie, and later tries to ask Gem out.
1093	44	Episode 44	Fiona Walton	Barbara Machin	4 August 2018	4.99
Alicia walks into the police station and reports Eddie. CCTV footage from the pub Alicia and Eddie were in shows Alicia going to kiss Eddie. Then, at the local corner shop, Eddie is shown on their CCTV buying condoms. Further footage from an alleyway shows Alicia and Eddie having consensual sex. Alicia is horrified by what she sees, as memories flood back to the evening they had. Eddie is arrested by the police at the hospital and interviewed. He is released on bail and subsequently suspended from the ED upon further investigation. A series of flashbacks reveal that when Eddie went to have sex with Alicia a second time, she said no, but froze. Eddie visits Alicia's house and confronts her over her version of events. Alicia tells Eddie he is a rapist, and he angrily throws her through the French doors in her house, leaving her badly injured. Iain and Ruby take Alicia to the hospital in the ambulance, but something causes Iain to swerve on the motorway, causing the ambulance to flip, leaving Ruby, Alicia and Iain's lives in danger.

== Reception ==
The first episode of the series, part one of the two-part special, received praise from viewers on Twitter. Viewers enjoyed the portrayal of the refugee crisis and commended the show for highlighting the issue, with comments including, "Well done [Casualty] for highlighting the harsh reality of what refugees go through every single day. It needs to stop" and "A powerful, moving & hard-hitting ep of #casualty addressing the #refugeecrisis." Other viewers found the episode "heartbreaking" and "dramatic" and the cinematography and style of the episode "beautiful" and "excellent". Viewers also enjoyed the bromance between Dylan and David, with one viewer calling it "the best Casualty thing" since Nick Jordan (Michael French) appeared on the show.

Casualty made the shortlist for the National Television Awards 2018, under the drama category. Casualty was shortlisted in the "Best Soap/Continuing Drama" category at the 2018 Broadcast Awards, but lost out to Channel 4 soap opera Hollyoaks. Judges praised the drama for its portrayal of an emergency department, commenting, "Casualty delivered one of the most moving and realistic depictions of the powerlessness of nurses in a crisis situation". Casualty was then nominated for a BAFTA on 4 April 2018, under the "Soap and Continuing Drama" category, alongside Coronation Street, Emmerdale and Hollyoaks. The show was successful, winning the award for the second time. The drama was nominated in the "Best Soap (Evening)" category at the 2018 Digital Spy Reader Awards; it came in last place with 3.8% of the total votes.
