= Episode 1067 =

- Casualty episode
- Episode no.: Series 32; Episode 18
- Directed by: Julie Edwards
- Written by: Dana Fainaru
- Original air date: 6 January 2018
- Running time: 50 minutes

Guest appearances
- Owain Arthur as Glen Thomas; Sara Stewart as Professor Cornell; Linda Marlowe as Gloria Rhodes; Nicholas Boulton as Simon Feathering; Bailey Patrick as PC Rafe Graham; Jonathan Coote as Andrew Dayten; Leah Moyo as Elizabeth "Liz" Landerson; Mark Carlisle as Dream Pathologist

Episode chronology
← Previous "Episode 17"	Next → "Episode 1068"
- Casualty series 32

Episode 1067 of the British medical drama television series Casualty is the eighteenth episode of the thirty-second series and the 1067th episode overall. The episode was written by Dana Fainaru, directed by Julie Edwards and produced by Jo Johnson, and premiered on BBC One on 6 January 2018. The episode is a climax to Connie Beauchamp's (Amanda Mealing) cardiac tumour storyline, which sees her travel to London with Ethan Hardy (George Rainsford) to seek treatment. Mealing, who battled breast cancer in 2002, struggled with anxiety and posttraumatic stress disorder as a result of the storyline. The episode also further explores the friendship between Connie and Ethan, which is tested when Connie kisses Ethan and he does not respond.

The majority of the episode is set in London and the scenes were filmed on-location across one day in September 2017. Despite being filmed in September, the scenes were set in winter. Crew struggled to display this as passers-by were wearing summer clothing. Rainsford enjoyed filming in the city, although he felt it had a negative effect on the following day's filming. Episode 1067 also features the continuation of Dylan Keogh's (William Beck) alcoholism storyline. Actress Linda Marlowe guest starred in the episode for the storyline. The episode was promoted through promotional trailers, and was watched by 4.9 million viewers in a 28-day period. While Louise McCreesh of Digital Spy called the episode "emotional" and "heartbreaking", other elements of the episode were criticised for their lack of realism by critics and viewers alike.

== Plot ==
Connie Beauchamp (Amanda Mealing) wakes up flustered in the high-dependency unit of Holby City Hospital, having dreamt about her post-mortem. Her doctor, Simon Feathering (Nicholas Boulton), informs her that her cardiac tumour has grown but she cannot be operated on due to her ill health. Connie's friend Charlie Fairhead (Derek Thompson) visits her and berates registrar Ethan Hardy (George Rainsford) for not informing him about her ill health. Connie discharges herself and instructs Ethan to drive her to London, where she claims an old friend will give a second opinion on her treatment; Ethan eventually agrees. At the hospital, they meet Professor Arianne Cornell (Sara Stewart), who examines Connie but decides not to operate after deeming it too risky. Connie and Ethan argue about her respect for him; he reveals that he has Huntington's disease. Sitting by Tower Bridge, Connie and Ethan bond and she kisses him, but he pulls away. Embarrassed, Connie returns to her hotel room alone, where she gets a bath and passes out. Housekeeping finds Connie unconscious and she is taken to hospital, where Arianne diagnoses her with heart failure and operates on her. Ethan contacts Charlie, who learns that Connie is having an operation; Ethan rushes to the hospital. Despite some complications, the surgery is successful and the tumour is removed, leaving Connie relieved. Ethan and Charlie visit Connie, but she refuses to see Ethan.

Acting clinical lead Dylan Keogh (William Beck) wakes up hungover and late for work. While driving to the ED, elderly woman Gloria Rhodes (Linda Marlowe) collapses in front of his car while chasing her dog, Waffle. When she cannot get up, Dylan admits her into the emergency department (ED); she notices a smell of alcohol on Dylan's breath. Dylan and nurse Louise Tyler (Azuka Oforka) treat Gloria, but after being discharged, she suffers a second fall. Gloria explains that she lives in a carehome and Waffle is being taken away, so she decided to run away; she then blackmails Dylan about his drinking, hoping to keep Waffle. Dylan delays speaking to the police about the accident when they arrive in the ED, but eventually completes a breathalyser test, which is negative. After investigating, Dylan diagnoses Gloria with Gerstmann syndrome and a minor stroke; upset, Gloria lashes out at Dylan, who arranges for Gloria to keep Waffle at the carehome. She advises Dylan to seek help for his alcoholism and he later makes a call, explaining that he is struggling.

== Production ==
Episode 1067 is written by Dana Fainaru, directed by Julie Edwards and produced by Jo Johnson. A soundtrack consisting of "I Promise", as sung by Radiohead, features in the episode. The episode focuses on Connie Beauchamp (Amanda Mealing), who has a cardiac tumour, travelling to London with Ethan Hardy (George Rainsford) to get emergency medical treatment from medical professional Professor Arianne Cornell (Sara Stewart) after realising she may die soon. Episode 1067 features the climax to Connie's cardiac tumour storyline, which commenced in September 2017. Rainsford believed that the storyline formed good character development for his character. Mealing struggled to film Connie's storyline, having battled breast cancer in 2002, and found that she could relate to the dialogue used in the scenes. The actress struggled with anxiety and posttraumatic stress disorder as a result of the storyline. Mealing wanted to portray Connie's diagnosis accurately since it was a story she could relate with. Mealing had a bald cap applied to her by the show's makeup team for the scenes involving Connie without a wig. Stewart reprised her guest role in the Holby City episode "Ready or Not", broadcast on 9 January 2018.

On 28 September 2017, Rainsford shared images that revealed he was filming in London. The following day, Mealing shared images revealing she was also filming in the city. On 3 October, the show confirmed that they had filmed scenes on-location, in central London, with Mealing and Rainsford. They spent one day filming in the city and Rainsford found the on-location filming tiring, which he felt had a negative effect on the filming of the following day. In an interview with Elaine Reilly of What's on TV, Rainsford expressed his enjoyment at filming in London, stating that he liked filming near the landmarks. He also used the opportunity to go sightseeing in the city. Although the scenes were filmed in September, they were set in winter. The show struggled to make it look like winter because many passers-by were wearing short-sleeved t-shirts and eating icecream.

Connie makes the decision to travel to London to get treatment, despite advice from other medical professionals. A show insider explained that Connie understands that the likelihood that she will survive is "slim" as she is a trained cardiothoracic surgeon. They commented, "She's not prepared to just sit around and wait." Sarah Ellis of Inside Soap observed that Ethan is forced into "a mission of mercy" when Connie orders him to drive her to London for surgery that Arianne has agreed to perform. Rainsford described Connie and Ethan's journey to London as a "road trip". However, when they arrive, Ethan discovers that Arianne has not agreed to any surgery. When Ethan confesses that he has a Huntington's disease diagnosis, he and Connie agree to spend time in London. The show spokesperson pointed out that it is "unusual to see Connie letting her guard down".

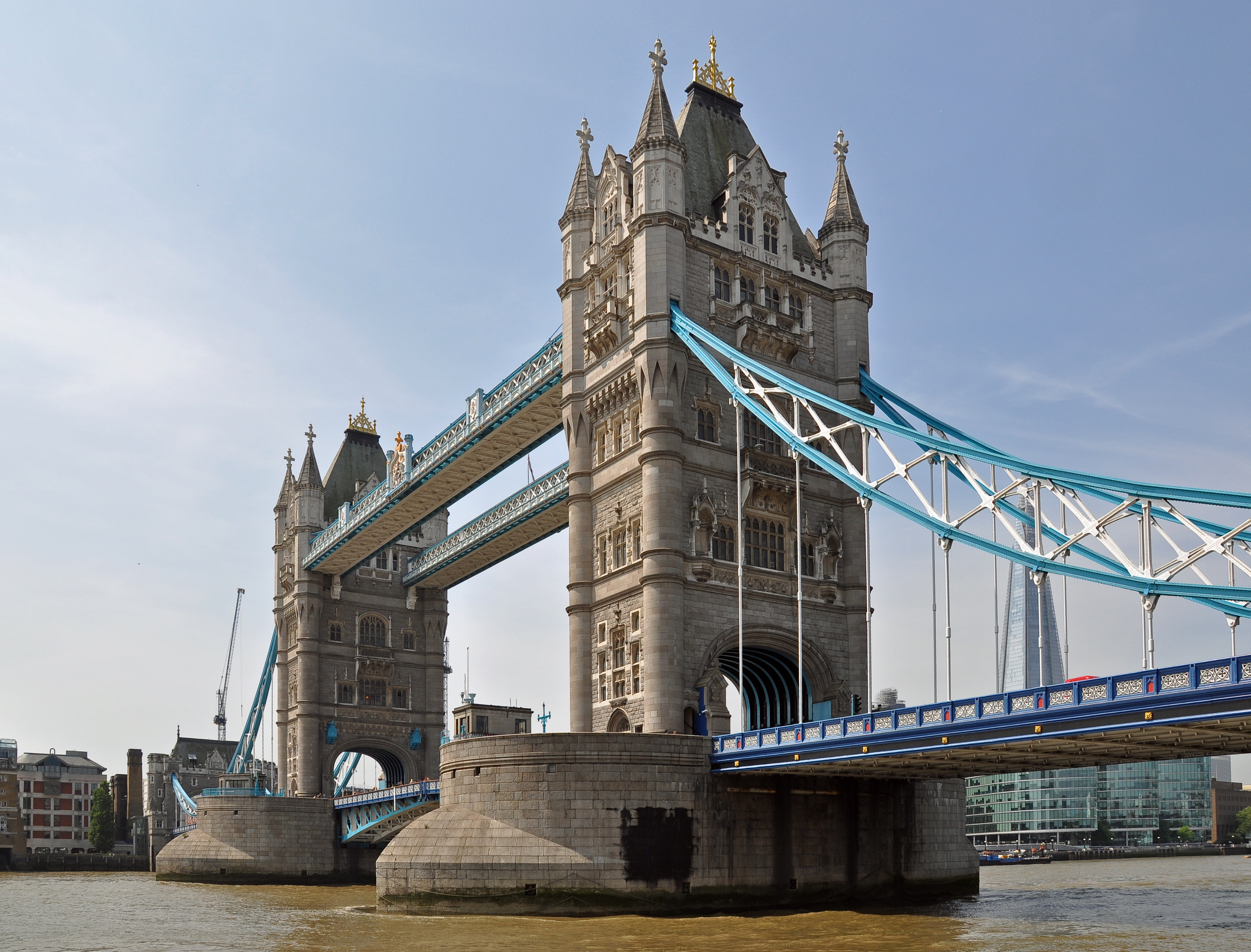
Some scenes for the episode were filmed near Tower Bridge.

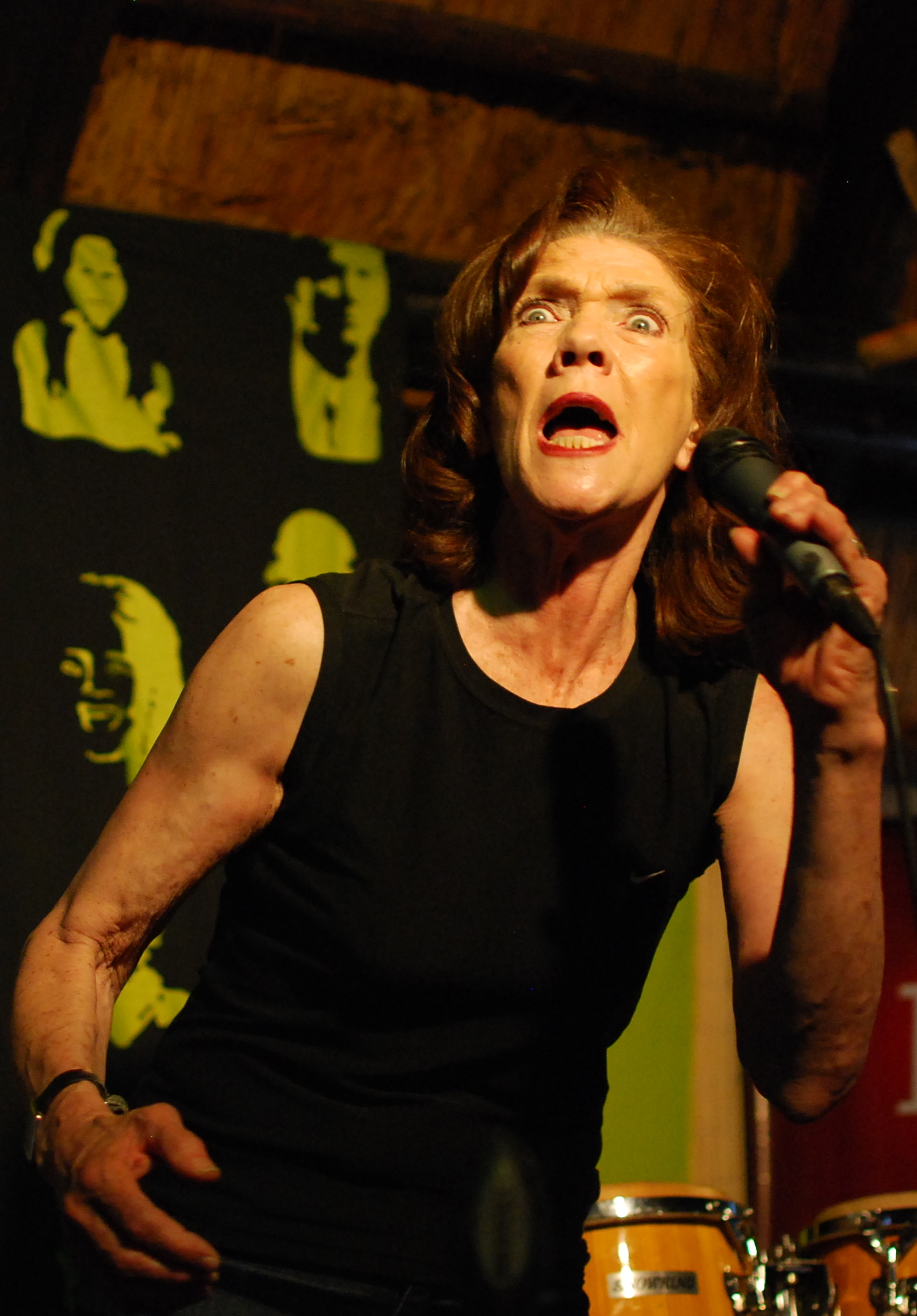
Actress Linda Marlowe (pictured) guest starred in the episode.

The episode explores Connie and Ethan's friendship. Rainsford thought that the couple had formed "this special bond". Connie and Ethan sit together beside the landmark Tower Bridge and Connie reminisces about her medical training. A show insider liked the scene and described it as "lovely". Connie then kisses Ethan, which the insider explained made the situation "very awkward, very quickly!" When Ethan does not respond, Connie is "mortified" and rushes off. In her hotel room, Connie rejects Ethan and begins ignoring him. Connie becomes "desperate" and tries drowning herself in the bathtub, forcing Arianne to operate on her. When Connie's condition deteriorates, her friend, Charlie Fairhead (Derek Thompson), is called and rushes to London. Connie's operation is successful and the tumour is removed. Following the broadcast of the episode, Mealing confirmed that she is remaining with the drama after speculation arose about whether she would be leaving. Rainsford explained that it would not be "an easy ride" for Connie and Ethan afterwards and added, "All I can say is that there is a lot more in store for both of them."

Episode 1067 also sees the continuation of Dylan Keogh's (William Beck) alcoholism storyline. Actress Linda Marlowe was hired to portray Gloira Rhodes in the episode as part of Dylan's storyline. Gloira is billed as a "stern ex-teacher". On the development in the storyline, an Inside Soap journalist stated, "Dylan's drinking spirals out of control this week". Dylan receives a call from Charlie to inform him that he is late for work, forcing him to drive while still drunk from the previous night. On his journey to work, Dylan nearly runs over Gloria and she suspects that he has been drinking. She decides to blackmail Dylan into finding her a nursing home that will accept her dog.

== Promotion and broadcast ==
External videos
- "Next Time: Episode 18"; A promotional trailer for the episode
- "Episode 18 – Preview Clip"; A preview clip of the episode

On 8 December 2017, the show released a trailer displaying Winter storylines, which previewed scenes filmed in London and Connie's battle with an aggressive heart tumour. Tom Chapman of Digital Spy predicted that Connie's battle would "go from bad to worse". On 30 December, a 35-second trailer for the episode was released, with a second trailer released on 5 January. The episode premiered on BBC One on 6 January 2018 and was available to watch on BBC iPlayer for thirty days after its broadcast.

== Reception ==
The episode received a seven-day rating of 4.69 million viewers, which is a decrease of 370,000 viewers from the previous episode. Ratings rose to 4.9 million viewers after a 28-day period. In the week of broadcast, episode 1067 was the twenty-third most-watched programme on BBC One.

Reilly (What's on TV) thought that Dylan had "met his match" with Gloira, while a What's on TV reporter thought that the scenes of Max caring for Gloira's dog were "cuteness squared!" Alison Graham of the Radio Times thought it was foolish of Ethan to drive Connie to London and was amazed that Connie had "a surprising number of devotees" in the episode considering her unpleasant personality. She was also pleasantly surprised that Casualty filmed in London, commenting, "And it really IS London – look, the Houses of Parliament! The London Eye! Tower Bridge!" Mealing received a positive response to the episode, which she said made her "overwhelmed". Louise McCreesh of Digital Spy observed that the "emotional" episode had "tugged at the heartstrings of fans". When Mealing asked whether the climax to the storyline was worth the wait, McCreesh opined that it was "so worth it."
