= Cystic tumour of the atrioventricular nodal region =

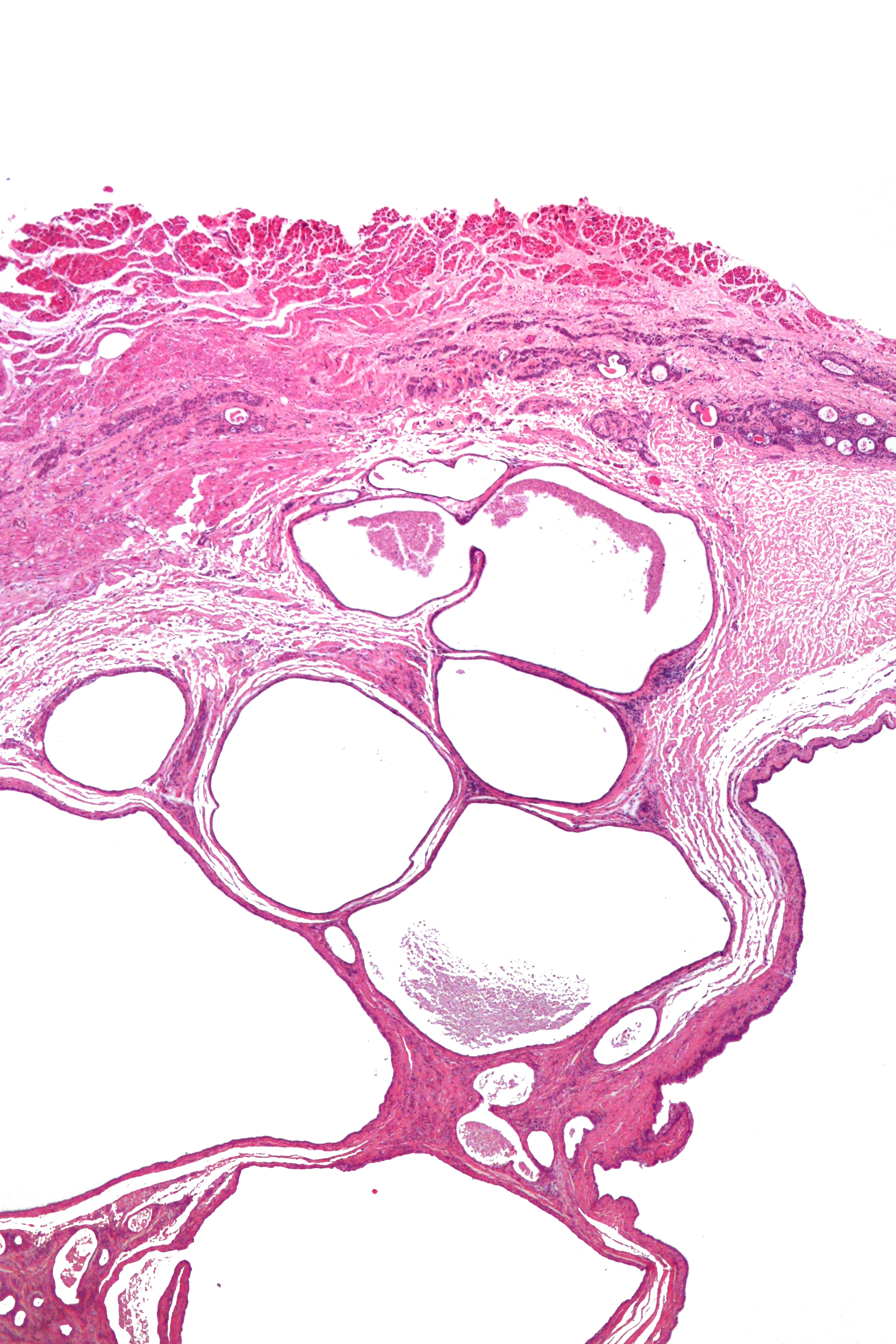
- Micrograph of a cystic tumour of the atrioventricular nodal region. H&E stain.
- Specialty: Cardiology, oncology

Cystic tumour of the atrioventricular nodal region is a very rare tumour of the heart in the region of the atrioventricular node. It is also known as mesothelioma of the atrioventricular node.

== Presentation ==
It may present as a cardiac arrhythmia or as sudden cardiac death.

== Pathology ==
Cystic tumours of the atrioventricular nodal region, true to their name, have cystic spaces, which are lined by a single layer of histomorphologically benign epithelial cells. The appearance is similar to that of lymphangioma and this is a name that has been used for this tumour.

== Treatment ==
The treatment of cystic tumours of the atrioventricular nodal region is surgical excision.

== See also ==
- Atrial myxoma
- Papillary fibroelastoma
