= Episode 1068 =

- Casualty episode
- Episode no.: Series 32; Episode 19
- Directed by: Judith Dine
- Written by: Matthew Barry; Kelly Jones
- Original air date: 13 January 2018
- Running time: 49 minutes

Guest appearances
- Sunetra Sarker as Zoe Hanna; Owain Arthur as Glen Thomas; Kai Thorne as Blake Gardner; Finney Cassidy as Miles Ashworth; Ben Mansfield as James Williams; Natalie Dew as Aisha Hassan; Claire King as Caryl Billington; Samuel Edward-Cook as Paul Billington

Episode chronology
← Previous "Episode 1067"	Next → "Episode 1069"
- Casualty series 32

Episode 1068 of the British medical drama television series Casualty is the nineteenth episode of the thirty-second series and the 1068th episode overall. The episode was written by Matthew Barry and Kelly Jones and directed by Judith Dine, and premiered on BBC One on 13 January 2018. The episode features the return of Zoe Hanna (Sunetra Sarker), who departed the drama in 2016, and departure of Zoe's estranged husband Max Walker (Jamie Davis), who has appeared on the drama for over three years. Sarker reprised her role for Davis' exit following a deal they made when she left the series. Davis' departure was not announced before the transmission of the episode as to surprise viewers, and the couple departed together.

The episode features an acid attack when a drug addict attacks a woman so he can steal her money. Sarker liked the decision to feature the attack as she felt it was topical. Zoe is later subject to the threat of acid being thrown in her face, which helps develop Max and Zoe's relationship. Episode 1068 also features Jacob Masters (Charles Venn) telling Elle Gardner's (Jaye Griffiths) son Blake Gardner (Kai Thorne) that he is his father as part of their ongoing storyline. Griffiths said that the development in the story would challenge Elle and Jacob's friendship. The episode was promoted through promotional trailers, and was watched by 5.16 million viewers in a 28-day period. While the episode received mainly positive reviews from critics and fans, some reviewers criticised the logic behind Max's ability to board the same plane as Zoe.

== Plot ==
Outside the emergency department (ED), porter Max Walker (Jamie Davis) bumps into old medical school friend James Williams (Ben Mansfield), who is waiting for his girlfriend, Aisha Hassan (Natalie Dew), to be discharged for hospital. At the same time, Max’s estranged wife and former consultant at the ED, Zoe Hanna (Sunetra Sarker), returns to Holby from America. Max is surprised when he notices Zoe in the hospital. He meets Zoe in the hospital carpark, where Zoe attempts to justify to Max her reasons for leaving him the first time around. As the pair discuss their past relationship, James is walking to his car with Aisha; he sees Max and leaves Aisha to talk to him. Whilst James and Max have a conversation, a masked figure approaches Aisha and throws acid at her face before stealing her handbag. Aisha screams in pain and Zoe and Max rush to Aisha’s aid.

The perpetrator, Paul Billington (Samuel Edward-Cook), runs away with Aisha’s bag and takes money from her purse. Paul begins smoking a joint, but passes out while smoking it, resulting in paramedics Sam Nicholls (Charlotte Salt) and Iain Dean (Michael Stevenson) admitting him to the ED. James visits Paul in cubicles, where it transpires that James paid Paul to splash Aisha with acid so that she would not leave him. Aisha reveals to Max that James has been abusing her, so Max sets up a safe place for Aisha where she cannot be found. James is furious by Aisha’s disappearance and holds Zoe hostage in the Resuscitation (Resus) room. He squirts a bottle of what he thinks is acid in Zoe’s face; it is water. James is arrested. Max realises that he still loves Zoe, who has now left the hospital to go to Madrid. He rushes to the airport and boards the plane Zoe is on, telling her he loves her. The pair fly out to Madrid together, leaving Holby behind them.

Elsewhere, consultant Elle Gardner’s (Jaye Griffiths) son, Blake Gardner (Kai Thorne) arrives at the department with a compass embedded in his hand. Nurse Jacob Masters (Charles Venn) treats Blake and learns he is being bullied, so stands up for Blake. As the two continue to bond, Jacob reveals to Blake that he is his father.

== Production ==
Actor Jamie Davis decided to leave his role as Max Walker in 2017 and called former co-star Sunetra Sarker, who portrayed Max's estranged wife Zoe Hanna for eight and a half years, to ask her to reprise her role for his departure, as part of a deal they made when Sarker left the drama in 2016. Sarker had forgotten the agreement when Davis contacted her, but agreed to return for one episode nevertheless. She said that returning for Davis' exit is very important to her due to the close relationship that the actors share. The actress also said that she missed working with Davis. Sarker told David Hollingsworth of What's on TV that she would only ever return to Casualty to explore Zoe and Max's relationship. The actress did not expect to reprise the role again, but said she enjoyed playing Zoe again. She added that she connected with Zoe as a character so liked reprising the role. Sarker stated that despite memorising her lines, she did not "feel like Zoe" until wearing Zoe's high heels and filming her first scene. She also loved the response from cast and crew when she returned and enjoyed the atmosphere on-set.

Sarker's return was announced on 7 September 2017 by series producer Lucy Raffety, who stated that Sarker would make a "sensational comeback" for one episode in early 2018, one-and-a-half years after her departure in episode 995 of the drama. Producers did not initially reveal Zoe's reasons for returning, although confirmed that she would be involved in a story with Max. Sarker felt that Max and Zoe's relationship was not correctly concluded when she left the series and believed that this episode would conclude the storyline. The actress said that the "banter" between Zoe and Max would be revisited as well as highlighting the "fizz" between the duo. Advanced spoilers released on 9 January 2018 revealed that Zoe would return to support Dylan Keogh (William Beck) after he contacts her and to seek a reconciliation with Max after he sends her divorce papers. Sarker explained that Zoe decides to "kill two birds with one stone" while in the UK. She also felt that with Max and Zoe planning to divorce, it is inevitable that they would see each other again.

On the moment that Zoe receives the divorce papers, Sarker explained that Zoe realises that she does not understand why she left Holby and realises how much she misses Max. However, the actress understood Max's feelings about their marriage and said that he does not want to constantly return to a failing relationship. Sarker said that she would like Zoe and Max to reconcile, but can understand Max's feelings surrounding their estranged marriage and felt "divided" between Max and Zoe's conflicting opinions. She commented, "Max would do anything for Zoe, but she's quite a selfish character, even though she does really love him."

"It's good for people to see what an acid attack actually is, how awful it is and how it's dealt with. I was really shocked at how people can just walk up to someone and spray something like that in their face."

— Actress Sunetra Sarker on the acid attack

It was confirmed on 8 December 2017 that Casualty would air an acid attack. In the episode, Aisha Hassan (Natalie Dew) is attacked in the hospital's car park. Samuel Edward-Cook appears as drug addict Paul Billington, who seeks financial support from his "world-weary" mother, Caryl Billington, portrayed by Claire King. Caryl rejects Paul so he attacks Aisha for money. Later, he is admitted to the ED, where Caryl visits him and nurse Charlie Fairhead (Derek Thompson) tries to reunite them. Sarker was pleased that the drama was tackling the subject as she felt it is "so relevant and current". Zoe tries to help Aisha when she is admitted to the ED. Sarker explained that Zoe goes "into autopilot" and finds it is easier to help the team than stand back and watch. She added, "Zoe's the type of woman who rolls up her sleeves and gets involved!" When Aisha's partner, James Williams (Ben Mansfield), becomes aggressive, he threatens to throw acid in Zoe's face. Sarker was surprised by the development. When James throws the acid in Zoe's face, it is revealed that it is water not acid. The incident helped Max to reevaluate his relationship with Zoe.

Producers decided to withhold the outcome of Episode 1068 to surprise the audience. Sarker teased, "it's never what you think with Zoe is it?" The actress liked the secrecy surrounding her return, but also struggled to keep it a secret. Despite the secrecy surrounding the outcome of the episode, advanced spoilers for the following episode released by Radio Times on 11 January 2018 suggested that Davis would make his final appearance in Episode 1068. As the episode concludes, Max rejects a reconciliation with Zoe and she leaves for the airport alone. However, when Zoe is seated onto her flight, Max arrives and announces that he is joining her. Davis was pleased with his exit and believed that it is best that Max and Zoe leave together. He was delighted to work with Sarker again and revisit Max and Zoe's story. On the episode, Sarker commented, "She only turns up for a day, but what a day it is! The episode is a real treat." Producer Dafydd Llewelyn enjoyed working with Sarker and Davis on the episode and praised them, while Sarker praised writers Matthew Barry and Kelly Jones and director Judith Dine for their work on the episode. The actress called her return "a real treat".

Episode 1068 also sees the continuation of a storyline between Elle Gardner (Jaye Griffiths) and Jacob Masters (Charles Venn). Elle told Jacob in episode 1065 that he is the father of her son, Blake Gardner (Kai Thorne). Producers informed Griffiths and Venn about the storyline when Griffiths joined the show in 2016. After returning from holiday, Jacob informs Elle that their friendship is over and that he will not be taking parental responsibility for Blake. He also asks her not to tell Blake about his parentage. Blake, who is being bullied, is admitted into the ED after being subject to "a cruel prank [that] goes wrong". When Jacob realises what is happening with Blake, he gives Blake some advice and threatens Blake's bully, Miles Ashworth (Finney Cassidy). At the end of the episode, Jacob reveals to Blake that he is his father without warning Elle. Griffiths told Elaine Reilly of What's on TV that Elle and Jacob's friendship would be "broken" by the story development and stated that their careers could also be impacted as they work closely together.

== Promotion and broadcast ==
External videos
- "Next Time: Episode 19 (S32)"; A promotional trailer for the episode
- "Episode 19 (Preview Clip)"; A clip from the episode

On 8 December 2017, the show released a trailer displaying Winter storylines, which previewed Zoe's return and clips from the episode. David Brown, writing for the Radio Times, thought that the clips would "whet fans' appetite". While Tom Chapman of Digital Spy predicted that Zoe's time in the USA was not successful based on the trailer. On 6 January 2018, a 16-second trailer for the episode was released, and a 42-second clip from the episode was released six days later. The episode premiered on BBC One on 13 January 2018 and was available to watch on BBC iPlayer for thirty days after its broadcast.

== Reception ==
=== Ratings ===
In its original broadcast, the episode received a seven day rating of 4.93 million viewers, which is an increase of 240,000 viewers from the previous episode. Ratings rose to 5.16 million viewers after a 28-day period. In the week of broadcast, episode 1068 is the seventeenth most-watched programme on BBC One.

=== Critical reception ===
A reporter for The Times chose Episode 1068 for their "critics' choice" of the day. They felt that the episode resembled recent NHS conditions, stating "Sometimes, life imitates art." Sophie Dainty of Digital Spy described the attack on Zoe as "frightening". On the episode, Katy Brent of Entertainment Daily joked, "Bet [Zoe] wishes she'd stayed in America." Emma Bullimore, writing for What's on TV, enjoyed Max and Zoe's reconciliation, describing it as "the perfect ending for a top notch couple." Despite this, Bullimore criticised the logic behind Max boarding the same plane as Zoe. She stated that Max would not know which plane Zoe is boarding, nor would he have been able to book a plane ticket on "such short notice". Bullimore's colleague, Amy Hunt, described the outcome of the episode as "sad" and "bittersweet".

Alison Graham of Radio Times liked Zoe's return and the acid attack, although she was disappointed that Zoe only returned for one episode. The reviewer was surprised when James stated that Max attended medical school and "read theoretical physics textbooks for fun". She quipped, "Yes, and I am Princess Stéphanie of Monaco." Journalist Andy Gibson liked the acid attack storyline, praising the show and Dew for portraying the topic. Despite this, he found the episode "intense".

"And there she was in all her magnificence, scrunching a ciggie out with her unfeasibly high, unfeasibly pointy shoe and slathering herself in Chanel No. 5. Max smelled her before he saw her – the cigarettes and Chanel combo that he knows and loves."

— Reviewer Sue Haasler on Zoe's first appearance in the episode

Sue Haasler, a writer for the Pauseliveaction, chose to review Episode 1068 following the news of Sarker's return and was pleased with Zoe's first appearance in the episode. Like Bullimore, Haasler criticised Max's quick ability to book and board the same flight as Zoe, as well as being able to arrange a visa to America. However, she felt that it was an appropriate ending for the couple. She said, "I needed a happy ending today and that's most certainly what it was." Haasler observed that after being admitted as a patient, Blake left the hospital "having acquired a few stitches and a new dad in the chunky shape of Jacob." The reviewer was also surprised by Max's backstory as a former medical student.

There was a mixed response from viewers of the episode: some fans were pleased with the outcome of the episode; others were "heartbroken" when Max and Zoe both departed; although many viewers felt they would miss the characters. What's on TV ran a poll on Twitter asking what fans wanted the outcome of the episode to be: 71% of responses expected Zoe and Max to reunite; 17% of responses wanted Zoe to "rescue" Dylan; 9% of responses hoped that Zoe would marry her former partner, Nick Jordan (Michael French); and 3% wanted Zoe to remain single.
