= Nevoid basal-cell carcinoma syndrome =

- Other names: Basal-cell nevus syndrome, Multiple basal-cell carcinoma syndrome, Gorlin syndrome, and Gorlin–Goltz syndrome
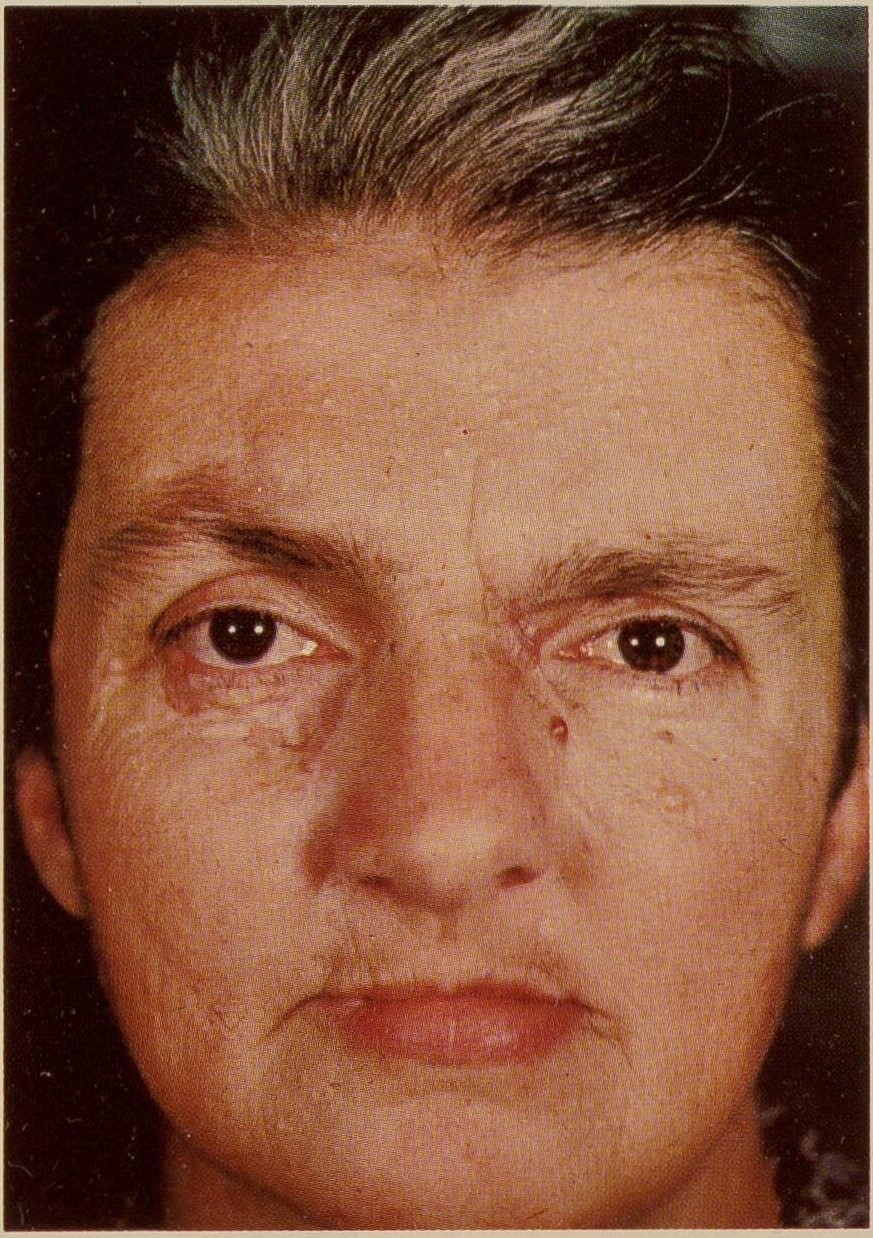
- Adult patient with NBCCS
- Specialty: Medical genetics

Nevoid basal-cell carcinoma syndrome (NBCCS) is a rare inherited medical condition involving defects within multiple body systems such as the skin, nervous system, eyes, endocrine system, and bones. People with NBCCS are prone to developing various cancers, including a common and usually non-life-threatening form of non-melanoma skin cancer called basal-cell carcinomas (BCCs). Only about 10% of people with the condition do not develop BCCs; the vast majority of patients develop numerous BCCs.

Gorlin syndrome refers to the American oral pathologist and human geneticist Robert J. Gorlin (1923–2006). The American dermatologist Robert W. Goltz (1923–2014) was his co-author, which is the basis for the term 'Gorlin-Goltz syndrome'.

First described in 1960 by Gorlin and Goltz, NBCCS is an autosomal dominant condition that can cause unusual facial appearances and a predisposition for basal-cell carcinoma, a type of skin cancer which rarely spreads to other parts of the body. The prevalence is reported to be 1 case per 56,000–164,000 population. Recent work in molecular genetics has shown NBCCS to be caused by mutations in the PTCH (Patched) gene found on chromosome arm 9q or the SUFU gene on chromosome arm 10q, though some patients do not have either known mutation. PTCH is important in regulating cell division and growth; thus, mutations in this gene can impact tumor growth. Children who inherit defective genes from either parent will also develop the disorder.

== Signs and symptoms ==
Some or all of the following may be seen in someone with Gorlin syndrome:

1. Multiple basal-cell carcinomas of the skin, most commonly on the face, hands or neck.
2. Odontogenic keratocyst: a benign tumor of the jawbone. Seen in 75% of patients and is the most common finding. Multiple lesions are usually found in the mandible. They occur at a young age (19 years average).
3. Pits on the soles of the feet and palms of their hands.
4. Rib and vertebrae anomalies
5. Intracranial calcification
6. Skeletal abnormalities: bifid ribs, kyphoscoliosis, early calcification of falx cerebri (diagnosed with AP radiograph)
7. Distinct faces: Frontal and temporoparietal bossing, hypertelorism, mandibular prognathism, cleft lip or palate, and macrocephaly.
8. Bilateral ovarian fibromas
9. 10% develop cardiac fibromas
10. ocular abnormalities: cataracts, coloboma, microphthalmia.
11. meningiomas

== Cause ==
Mutations in the human homologue of Drosophila patched (PTCH1), a tumor suppressor gene on chromosome 9, were identified as the underlying genetic event in this syndrome. PTCH1 codes for a transmembrane receptor that recognizes the Sonic Hedgehog ligand (SHH) and represses the Hedgehog (Hh) signaling pathway. The Hedgehog signaling pathway, which promotes cell proliferation and differentiation, is involved in more than 50% of cancers. Mutations in PTCH1 could reverse its inhibition of smoothened (SMO) and upregulate the Hedgehog pathway. SUFU codes for the suppressor of fused and inhibits the Hh signaling pathway further downstream by binding to glioma-associated (GLI) transcription factors to prevent translocation to the nucleus. Mutations of SUFU are also correlated with NBCCS. When PTCH1 is mutated, and SMO is no longer inhibited, SUFU becomes activated, and GLI can be translocated to the nucleus. SUFU mutations are associated with medulloblastoma, a diagnostic criterion for NBCCS. Up to 70% of people with NBCCS inherit a PTCH1 mutation, and around 4% inherit a SUFU mutation. Another 30% obtain a spontaneous, non-inherited mutation of the affected gene, resulting in the development of NBCCS.

== Diagnosis ==
The most common diagnosing physicians are oral surgeons and dermatologists. However, an NBCCS diagnosis can also be made by geneticists, dentists, orthodontists, primary care physicians, Mohs surgeons, and oncologists. Though not inclusive, this list includes most healthcare providers for diagnosis.

NBCCS diagnoses are made by having two major or one major and two minor criteria.

The major criteria consist of the following:

1. more than 2 BCCs or 1 BCC in a person younger than 20 years;
2. odontogenic keratocysts of the jaw
3. 3 or more palmar or plantar pits
4. ectopic calcification or early (<20 years) calcification of the falx cerebri
5. bifid, fused, or splayed ribs
6. first-degree relative with NBCCS.

The minor criteria include the following:

1. macrocephaly.
2. congenital malformations, such as cleft lip or palate, frontal bossing, eye anomaly (cataract, coloboma, microphthalmia, nystagmus).
3. other skeletal abnormalities, such as Sprengel deformity, pectus deformity, polydactyly, syndactyly or hypertelorism.
4. radiologic abnormalities, such as bridging of the sella turcica, vertebral anomalies, modeling defects or flame-shaped lucencies of hands and feet.
5. ovarian and cardio fibroma or medulloblastoma (the latter is generally found in children under two).

The first presentation of NBCCS is often odontogenic keratocysts that begin to occur, on average, around 13 years of age. Other common initial presentations include multiple BCCs before the age of 20 and medulloblastoma occurring around the age of two.

People with NBCCS need education about the syndrome, and may need counseling and support, as coping with the multiple BCCs and multiple surgeries is often difficult. They should reduce UV light exposure to minimize the risk of BCCs. They should also be advised that receiving Radiation therapy for their skin cancers may be contraindicated. They should look for symptoms referable to other potentially involved systems: the CNS, the genitourinary system, the cardiovascular system, and dentition.

Genetic counseling is advised for prospective parents, since one parent with NBCCS causes a 50% chance that their child will also be affected. Genetic testing is sufficient to confirm the diagnosis when there is suspicion, but it lacks clinical diagnostic criteria. It is also beneficial for prenatal testing when there is a known family history of NBCCS.

== Treatment ==
Treatment is usually multidisciplinary, supportive treatment, that is, treatment to reduce any symptoms rather than to cure the condition. Having a multidisciplinary medical team is important for managing the symptoms, preventing new tumors, and providing support. Many people with NBCCS regularly see physicians and medical professionals, including a primary care physician, dermatologist, cardiologist, oral surgeon, therapist, plastic surgeon, neurologist, and gynecologist. Building a medical care team provides patients with the tools for managing their condition.

- Enucleation of the odontogenic cysts can help, but new lesions, infections and jaw deformity are usually a result.
- Patients may have numerous BCCs, which can be treated surgically or, in some patients, with topical medications. The severity of the basal-cell carcinoma determines the prognosis for most patients. Individually, BCCs rarely cause gross disfigurement, disability or death, but the scar burden and ongoing development of BCCs may be significant
- Genetic counseling

Proper sun protection is extremely important for patients with suspected and confirmed diagnoses of NBCCS. Patients and their families should monitor for signs of NBCCS, including developmental delays, abnormal skin lesions, and odontogenic keratocysts, between visits with their multidisciplinary team.

== Incidence ==
NBCCS has an incidence of 1 in 50,000 to 150,000, with a higher incidence in Australia. One aspect of NBCCS is that basal-cell carcinomas will occur on areas of the body which are not generally exposed to sunlight, such as the palms and soles of the feet, and lesions may develop at the base of palmar and plantar pits. One of the prime features of NBCCS is the development of multiple BCCs at an early age, often in the teen years. Each person with this syndrome is affected differently; some have more characteristics of the condition than others.

== Resources ==
The Gorlin Syndrome Alliance (GSA) is an organization designed to raise awareness and connect those with NBCCS or those who know someone with NBCCS. Within the entirety of the GSA community, there is a great amount of support, education, and drive for furthering research.

== See also ==
- List of cutaneous conditions
- List of radiographic findings associated with cutaneous conditions
- List of dental abnormalities associated with cutaneous conditions
- List of cutaneous conditions associated with increased risk of nonmelanoma skin cancer
