= Cardiac fibroma =

- Other names: Cardiac fibrous hamartoma, Fibroelastic hamartoma of heart
- Specialty: Cardiology/oncology

Cardiac fibroma, also known as cardiac fibromatosis, cardiac fibrous hamartoma, fibroelastic hamartoma of heart and fibroma of heart is the second highest type of primary cardiac tumor seen in infants and children. This benign tumor made by connective tissue and fibroblast is largely observed in the ventricles of the heart. The left ventricle is the most common location of cardiac fibroma and accounts for approximately 57% of cardiac fibroma cases followed by the right ventricle with 27.5% of cases. Symptoms of the disease depend on the size of the tumor, its location relative to the conduction system, and whether it obstructs blood flow. Two-thirds of children with this tumor are asymptomatic, showing no signs and symptoms. Therefore the cause of cardiac fibroma is unexplained but has been associated with Gorlin Syndrome. Echocardiography is the primarily diagnostic method used to detect if an individual has cardiac fibroma. Resection of the tumor is recommended however heart transplantation is done if surgery is not possible. Overall prognosis of resection is favorable and the chance of recurrence is scarcely reported.

== Signs and symptoms ==
Signs and symptoms in cardiac fibroma are nonspecific, some individuals experience arrhythmias, dyspnea, cyanosis, chest-pain and sudden mortality. In addition, the majority of individuals with cardiac fibroma are asymptomatic therefore leading to signs and symptoms that depend on the size and location of the tumor. Tumors range from millimeters to extensive tumors in the range of 12.5 x 10.0 x 8.5 cm. For instance, individuals with larger tumors due to cardiac fibroma which include the conduction system of the heart can demonstrate cardiac dysrhythmias as a symptom.

== Cause ==
The cause of cardiac fibroma is still unknown. However, some tumors have been found to be associated with Gorlin syndrome which is also known as Nevoid Basal Cell Carcinoma Syndrome (NBCCS). NBCCS is a genetic condition that affects various parts of the body and increases the possibility of acquiring distinct cancerous and non cancerous tumors.

== Mechanism ==
The mechanism behind cardiac fibromas is still unclear. Fibromas have a homogeneous mass of fibroblasts mixed with an abundance of collagen and elastic fibers. These masses represent mesenchymal growth, but lack other mesenchymal elements, such as blood vessels, cartilage bone, and muscle. These masses often entrap cardiomyocytes, which are muscle cells that make up the cardiac muscle; cells decrease while collagen content increase in these masses. The growth of cardiac fibromas are also slow and produce detrimental physical effects. This is due to infiltration and replacement of myocardium which protrude into the cavity of the heart. These tumors usually occur within the anterior wall of the left ventricle or the interventricular septum and rarely involves the right ventricle.

== Diagnosis ==
Early and precise diagnosis of cardiac fibroma can lead to healing and avoidance of surgery. Echocardiography is the preferred initial method of diagnosis for cardiac fibroma. This is due to the exams non-invasiveness, reduced cost and extensive availability. Echocardiography depicts the morphologic appearance, region and motion of the tumor. On the other hand, additional examinations such as Computed Tomography (CT) and Magnetic Resonance Imaging (MRI) are also conducted for additional diagnostic information. The CT exam provides precise spatial resolution of the tumor meanwhile an MRI provides a comprehensive overview of tissue characterization and does not expose the patient to radiation. Tumor biopsy is utilized in cardiac fibroma as the gold standard to confirmation a patient diagnosis with cardiac fibroma. Family medical history and physical examination of an individual is also used as a diagnostic method, close examination of the heart is concluded along with careful detection of any abnormal heart sounds.

== Treatment ==
Cardiac fibroma is commonly treated through surgical excision procedures. The removal of the cardiac tumor requires open heart surgery. During surgery, the tumor and tissues around it is removed to reduce the risk of the tumor returning. Recovery after surgery is between 4–5 days in the hospital and 6 weeks in total. An echocardiogram is taken every year after the surgery to make sure the tumor has not returned or formed any new growth. On the other hand, if surgery is not possible, a heart transplantation is required.

== Prognosis ==
Cardiac fibromas in infancy which are unable to be removed surgically due to size and extensive myocardial infiltration, have a poor prognosis. The is due to the high ratio of tumor-to-heart size that may produce low cardiac output and as a result lead to a poorer prognosis. As a result, defibrillator implantation or cardiac transplantation may be required. However, tumors that are able to be surgically removed even incompletely have a good prognosis. Long-term survival after surgical resection is favorable, and the chance of recurrence is scarcely reported.

== Epidemiology ==
Cardiac fibromas account for 12%-16% of primary cardiac tumors in children. Therefore, leading it to be the second most common benign cardiac tumor in children. However, it has rarely been found in adults but mainly found in infants under the age of one.

== Research directions ==
Literature Survey on Epidemiology and Pathology of Cardiac Fibroma:

During this study, researchers searched through the literature databases on cardiac fibroma to find factors that predict poor outcomes that lead to death. Researchers found that patients who did not survive were significantly younger than those who did survive. These results suggest that younger individuals diagnosed with cardiac fibroma are associated with a poorer outcome. Researchers found no significant difference between the maximum diameter of the tumor between age groups. However, although younger individuals have smaller hearts, the high ratio of tumor-to-heart sizes may generate low cardiac output, which leads to a poor outcome. In addition, literature revealed that 18 of 178 patients with cardiac fibroma were diagnosed during prenatal and neonatal periods, resulting in the tumor having a certain size regardless of the child's age. These findings suggest that cardiac fibromas may be a congenital disorder.

Successful Surgical Excision of a Large Cardiac Fibroma in an Asymptomatic Child:

A 3-year-old girl, who was asymptomatic, underwent a successful surgical excision of a large cardiac fibroma. The individual had frequent coughs, and therefore underwent several diagnostic exams to diagnose the cause of her frequent cough. A cardiac mass was found on the echocardiograph and later was confirmed by magnetic resonance imaging (MRI). The cardiac mass was monitored and after 24 hours, it showed sinus rhythms of normal variability. In addition, the mass dimensions were 38 X 28 mm in the apical area of the left ventricle. A surgical procedure was recommended due to the risk of ventricular arrhythmias and sudden cardiac death. The surgery was a success and physicians were able to remove the entire tumor without any complications. Follow-up evaluations at six-months and a year showed the patient in good health and no signs of tumor recurrence.

Primary Cardiac Tumors in Children: A Center's Experience:

The Department of Cardiac Surgery Children's Hospital in China conducted a study to analyze different characteristics and outcomes of pediatric patients who have primary cardiac tumors treated in their center. They had sixteen patients with primary cardiac tumors between the ages of 1–13 years. All patients were diagnosed by echocardiography, MRI, and CT. 15 of the 16 patients were able to get successful remove of their mass and one patient had partial resection. However, one patient did die during surgery due to low cardiac output syndrome after five days of their initial surgery to remove their mass. The pathological examination of the cardiac masses showed that rhabdomyoma is the most frequent tumor in children, followed by myxoma and fibromas; morbidity of rhabdomyomas and fibromas were reported higher in infancy, while myxomas were more frequent in older children.
