= Papillary fibroelastoma =

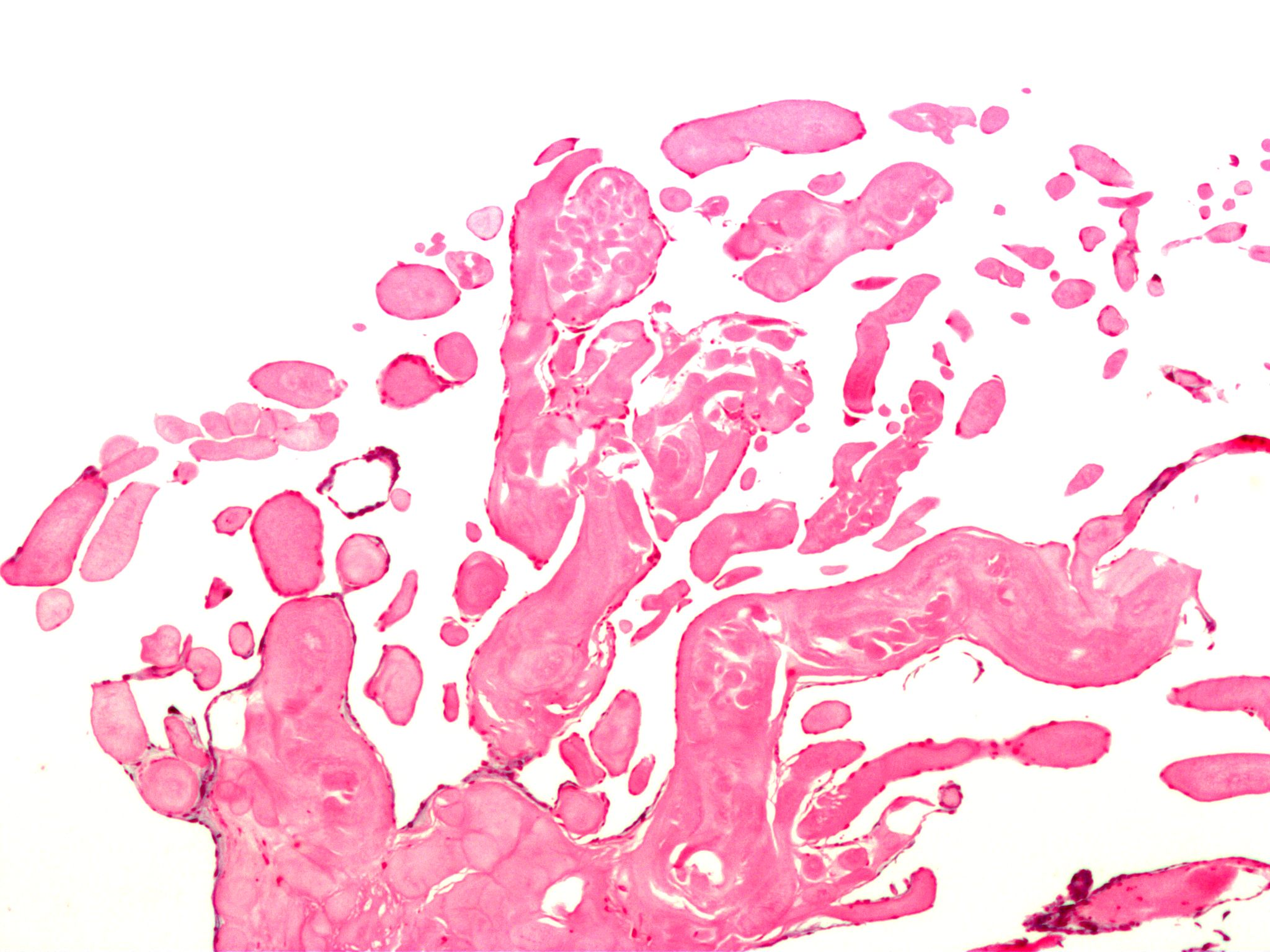
- Low magnification micrograph of an excised aortic valve papillary fibroelastoma showing the characteristic avascular branching papillae, H&E stain
- Specialty: Oncology, cardiology

A papillary fibroelastoma is a primary tumor of the heart that typically involves one of the heart valves. Papillary fibroelastomas, while considered uncommon, make up about 10 percent of all primary tumors of the heart. They are the third most common type of primary tumor of the heart, behind cardiac myxomas and cardiac lipomas.

== Signs and symptoms ==
A papillary fibroelastoma is generally considered pathologically benign, however outflow obstruction or embolism can be associated with syncope, chest pain, heart attack, stroke and sudden cardiac death.

Symptoms due to papillary fibroelastomas are generally due to either mechanical effects of the tumor or due to embolization of a portion of the tumor to a distal organ. In particular, chest pain or syncope may be due to transient occlusion of the left main coronary artery by the tumor, while a heart attack or sudden cardiac death may be due to embolization of a portion of the tumor into a coronary artery.

== Diagnosis ==
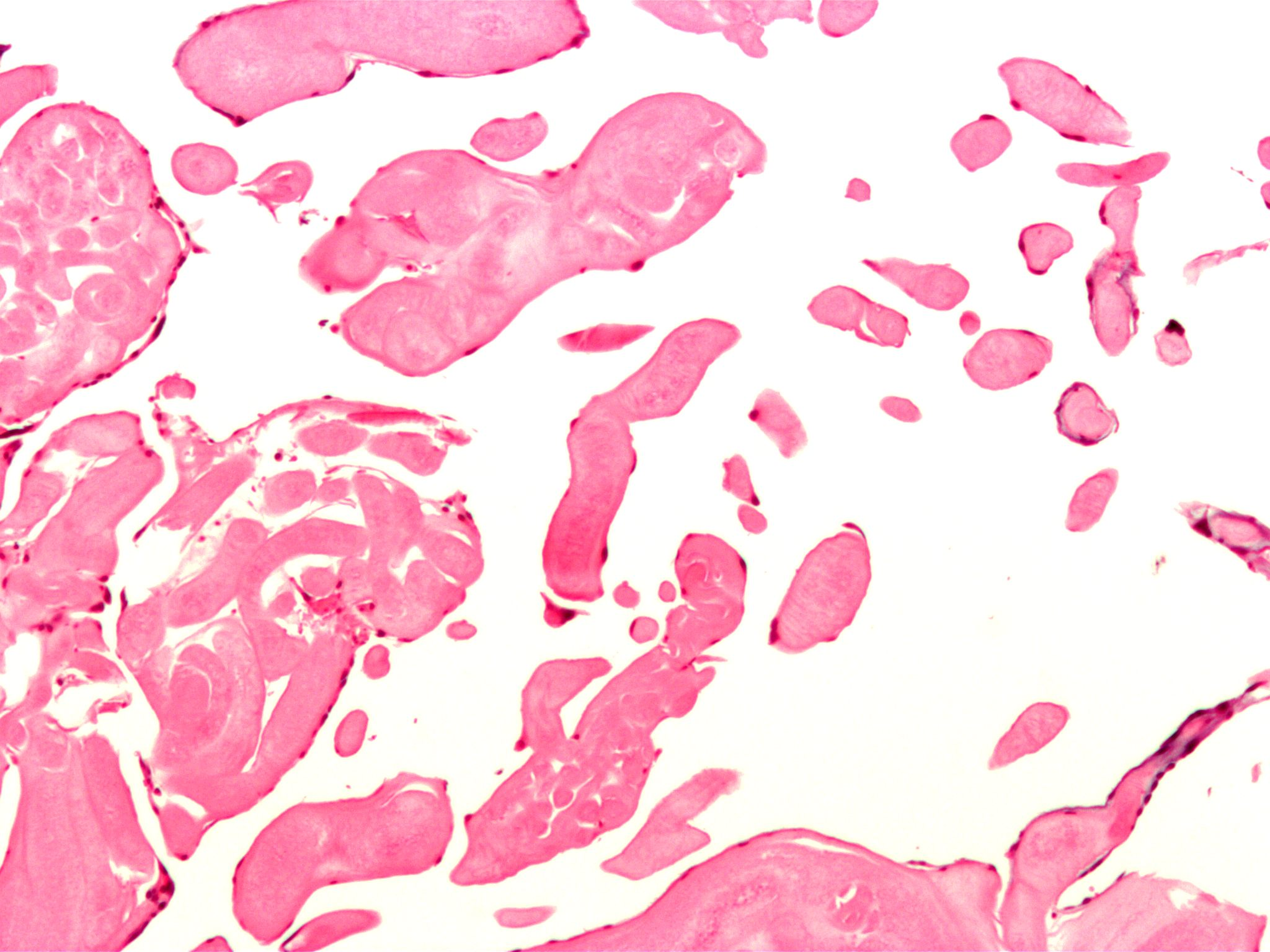
Micrograph of an excised aortic valve papillary fibroelastoma showing that the avascular branching papillae are covered by endothelium. H&E stain.

Papillary fibroelastoma are typically found and accurately diagnosed by imaging. The diagnosis is confirmed by pathology. Histologically, papillary fibroelastomas have branching avascular papillae, composed of collagen, that are covered by endothelium.

== Treatment ==
If the tumor is found incidentally in an asymptomatic person, the treatment approach is controversial. Certainly a conservative approach is warranted in certain individuals. If the tumor is large, greater than 1 cm in asymptomatic patients, and pedunculated, a case may be made for surgical excision prior to symptoms developing due to the higher risk of embolism. However, this is still considered controversial.

If the papillary fibroelastoma is associated with symptoms, surgical excision is generally recommended for relief of symptoms. A minimally invasive approach may be possible if the tumor involves the aortic valve or right atrium. In the case of aortic valve involvement, excision of the tumor is often valve-sparing, meaning that replacement of the valve with a prosthetic valve is not necessary. Repair of the native valve with a pericardial patch has been described.

== See also ==
- Endocardial fibroelastosis
