= Primary tumors of the heart =

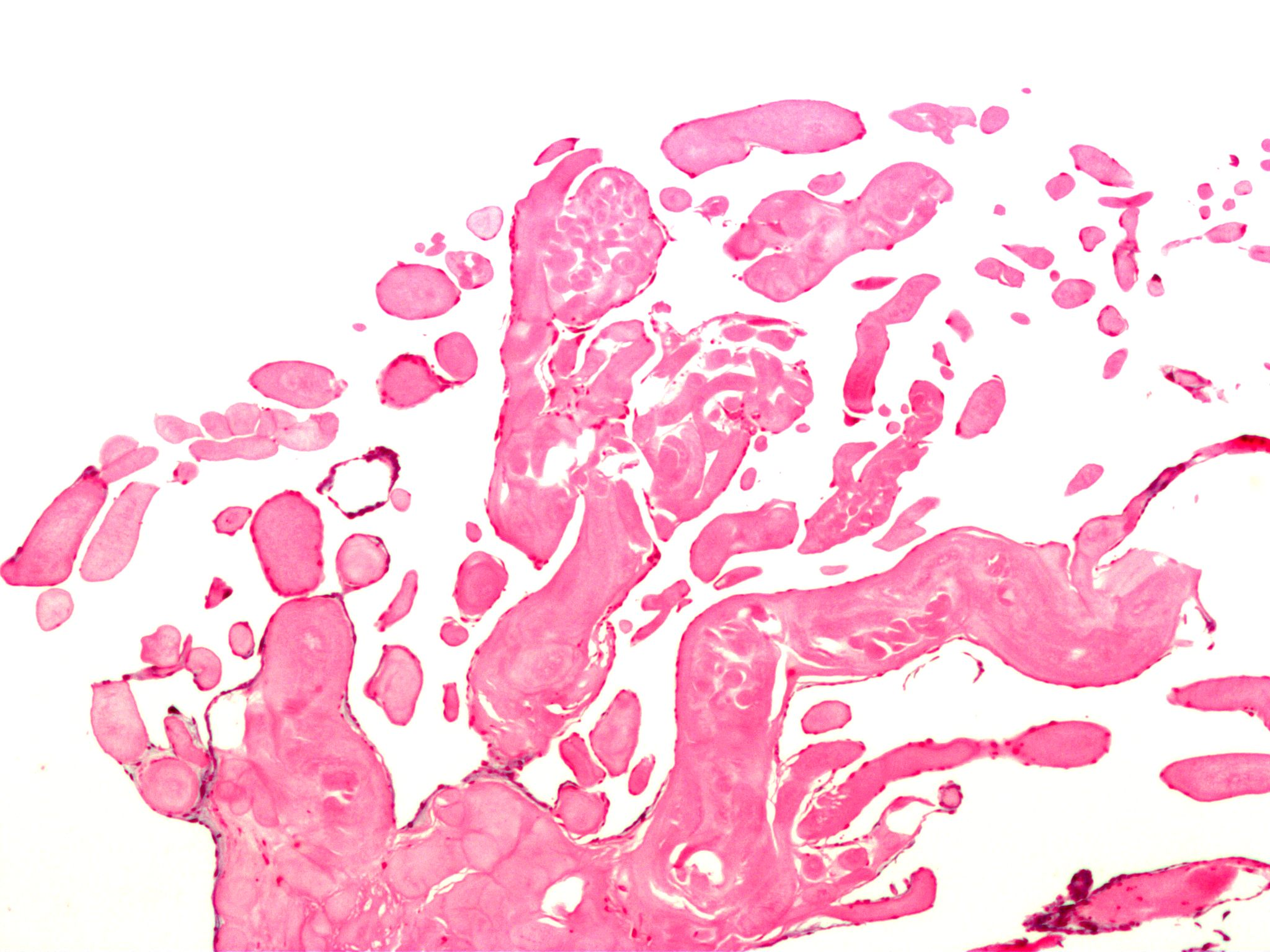
- Micrograph of a papillary fibroelastoma, a benign tumor of heart valves. H&E stain.
- Specialty: Oncology, cardiac surgery

Primary tumors of the heart are extremely rare tumors that arise from the normal tissues that make up the heart. The incidence of primary cardiac tumors has been found to be approximately 0.02%. This is in contrast to secondary tumors of the heart, which are typically either metastatic from another part of the body, or infiltrate the heart via direct extension from the surrounding tissues. Metastatic tumors to the heart are about 20 times more common than primary cardiac tumors.

== Types ==
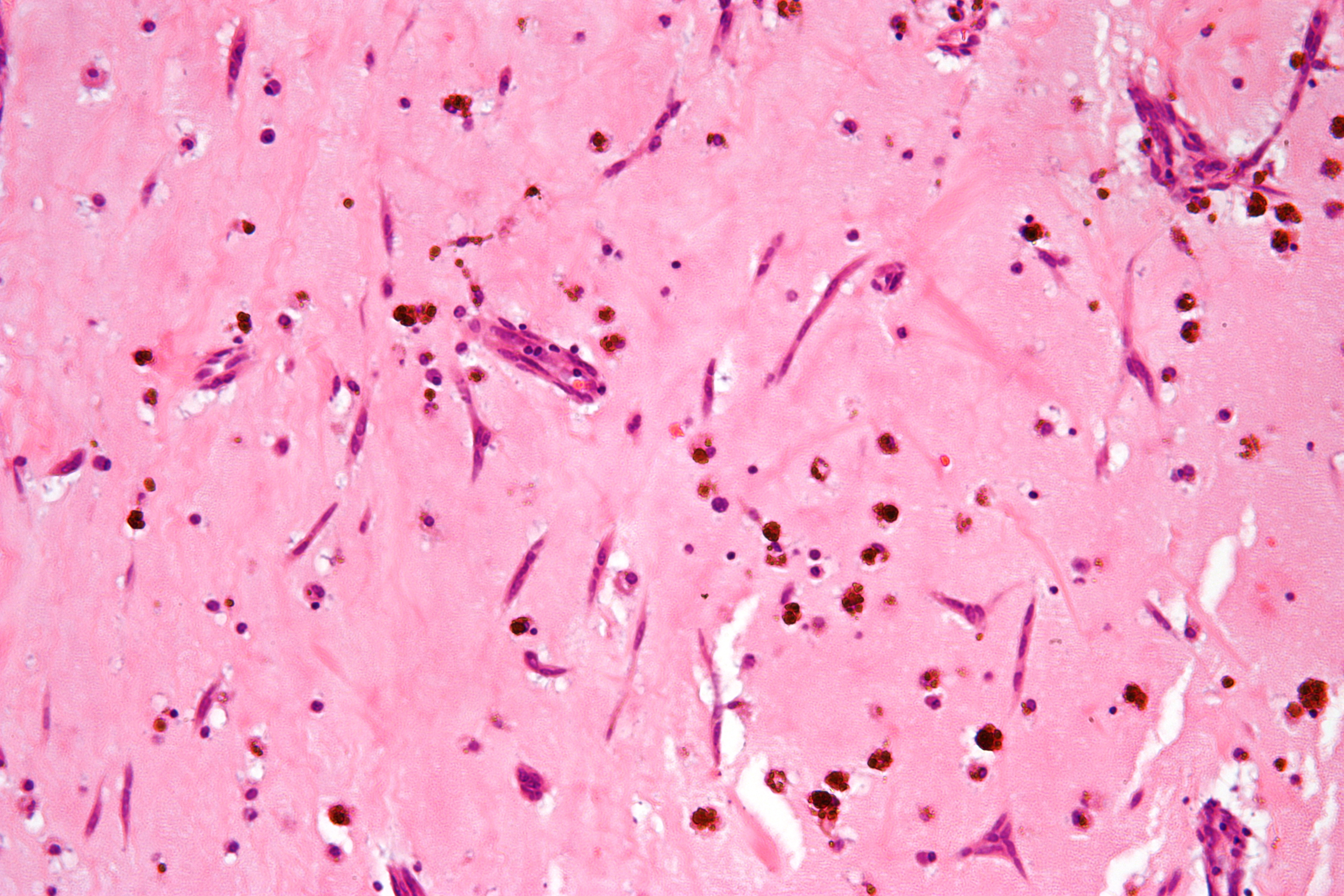
Micrograph of an atrial myxoma, the most common primary tumor of the heart.

=== Benign ===
The most common primary tumor of the heart is the myxoma. In surgical series, the myxoma makes up as much as 77% of all primary tumors of the heart. Less common tumors of the heart include:

- Lipoma
- Rhabdomyoma
- Cystic tumor of the atrioventricular nodal region.
- Lipomas and lipomatous hypertrophy of the interatrial septum: the second most frequent primary cardiac tumor, usually located in the subepicardium
- Papillary fibroelastoma
- Fibroma
- Teratoma

=== Malignant ===
About 20 percent of primary tumors of the heart are malignant in nature. Malignant tumors of the heart include rhabdomyosarcomas, angiosarcomas, myxosarcomas, fibrosarcomas, leiomyosarcomas, reticulum cell sarcomas, desmoplastic small round cell tumor, and liposarcomas. Angiosarcoma is the most common primary cardiac malignancy. It tends to occur in the right atrium and involve the pericardium. Cardiac sarcomas may occur at any age but are more commonly seen in individuals in their 20s to 40s. They occur equally in males and females. Rhabdomyosarcoma is the most common primary cardiac malignancy in children and is more likely than other primary cardiac sarcomas to involve the valves.

=== Valvular ===
A subset of the primary tumors of the heart are tumors that are found on the valves of the heart. Tumors that affect the valves of the heart are found in an equal distribution among the four heart valves. The vast majority of these are papillary fibroelastomas. Primary tumors of the valves of the heart are more likely to occur in males. While most primary tumors of the valves of the heart are not malignant, they are more likely to have symptoms related to the valve, including neurologic symptoms and (in a few cases) sudden cardiac death.

== Clinical manifestations ==
In general, tumors might manifest in one of three ways:

Systemic symptoms include constitutional symptoms (fever, arthralgias, weight loss, weariness) and paraneoplastic disorders (PCTs).

Cardiovascular symptoms: mass effect compromising myocardial function or blood flow, causing arrhythmias, obstruction of heart valves leading to regurgitation, or pericardial effusion with or without tamponade. Primary symptoms include breathlessness, chest pain, presyncope, and syncope.

Thromboembolic symptoms: lung and systemic thromboembolic condition resulting from the tumor.

Symptoms caused by primary cardiac tumors are usually dependent on size and location. Cardiac tumors can cause a variety of symptoms. The mass size can obstruct blood flow or interfere with cardiac valve function and produce symptoms of heart failure. A tumor that invades the heart walls may cause arrhythmias, heart block, or pericardial effusion with or without tamponade. Tumors that invade adjacent lung tissue may cause pulmonary symptoms that mimic bronchogenic carcinoma. The tumor may break apart and can embolize. Embolization can be systemic or pulmonic. Tumors with the highest anatomic risk for embolization are located in the left atrium or aortic valve. Some tumors produce no symptoms and are incidentally found.

Systemic symptoms

Primary cardiac tumors may secrete factors including interleukin-6 and endothelin. This may contribute to systemic inflammatory or autoimmune manifestations. Systemic symptoms including fever, fatigue, arthralgia, anemia, elevated white blood cell count, thrombocytosis, thrombocytopenia, hypergammaglobulinemia, and elevated erythrocyte sedimentation rate. Myxomas have been found to produce vascular endothelial growth factor, which contributes to the development of new blood vessels and the early stages of tumor growth.

== Diagnostic evaluation ==
The initial diagnostic evaluation is to determine whether or not a cardiac tumor is present, the location of the tumor, and if the tumor is benign or malignant.

Initial imaging is often performed by echocardiography. Benign lesions have a distinct appearance on an echocardiogram. An echocardiogram can identify the presence of a mass and its mobility. The echocardiogram can also identify a mass causing obstruction of circulation. The echocardiogram can provide accurate information as to whether the tumor is malignant or benign.

Cardiac magnetic resonance imaging can identify the chemical microenvironment within the tumor, thus providing more information as to the type of tumor present.

Cardiac computed tomography is useful when MRI is unavailable or contraindicated.

Coronary angiography is used to identify the blood supply to cardiac tumors.

== Treatment and prognosis ==
The vast majority of the tumors of the heart have a benign course and are not directly fatal. However, even the benign tumors of the heart can be lethal due to either direct extension into the electrical conduction system of the heart (causing complete heart block or a fatal dysrhythmia), or due to emboli from the tumor mass that may have lethal sequelae. Prompt resection is indicated for myxomas due to the risk of embolization or cardiovascular complications. Close observation has also been suggested for cardiac tumors that are small (<1 cm) and non-mobile.

The malignant tumors of the heart have a worse prognosis. Cardiac sarcomas generally lead to death within 2 years of diagnosis, due to rapid infiltration of the myocardium of the heart and obstruction of the normal flow of blood within the heart.

== See also ==
- Cardiac fibroma
