= Casualty series 37 =

Casualty
- Series 37
- Starring: William Beck; Di Botcher; Anna Chell; Milo Clarke; Jason Durr; Nigel Harman; Amanda Henderson; Melanie Hill; Shalisha James-Davis; Jaye Jacobs; Shaheen Jafargholi; Elinor Lawless; Kirsty Mitchell; Neet Mohan; George Rainsford; Eddie-Joe Robinson; Sarah Seggari; Arin Smethurst; Michael Stevenson; Derek Thompson; Charles Venn; Barney Walsh
- No. of episodes: 43

Release
- Original network: BBC One; BBC One HD
- Original release: 20 August 2022 – 19 August 2023

Series chronology
- ← Previous; Series 36 Next → Series 38

The thirty-seventh series of the British medical drama television series Casualty commenced airing in the United Kingdom on BBC One on 20 August 2022 and finished on 19 August 2023. The series focuses on the professional and personal lives of medical and ancillary staff at the emergency department (ED) of the fictional Holby City Hospital.

Jon Sen continues his role as the executive producer and Liza Mellody begins her position as series producer. Series 37 marks the return to regular filming protocols after the COVID-19 pandemic. The series has been marred by scheduling conflicts, with one episode premiering on BBC Two.

Following his appointment, Sen decided to alter the format of the show, removing the accidents that bring patients to the ED and instead having patients arrive injured. Starting in January 2023, he opted to split the series into 12 episode groups with a single story strand running through. The decision stems from a desire to adapt against other dramas and content available, as well as modernising the Casualty brand. The show's story team placed the pressures of working in the NHS at the focus of the series. A special improvised episode exploring the paramedic team was commissioned.

15 regular cast members reprised their roles from the previous series. Using these main characters, the issues of mental health, BRCA1, surrogacy and coercive control were explored, with some stories continuing from the previous series. Three of the show's main cast opted to leave their respective roles during the series, while another regular cast member's character was killed-off. The opening episode of the series received a positive reception from television critics and NHS workers. The series has also received criticism; Sophie Dainty of Digital Spy opined that scheduling disruption had resulted in pacing issues and leaving the drama in "one of the most turbulent" periods.

== Production ==
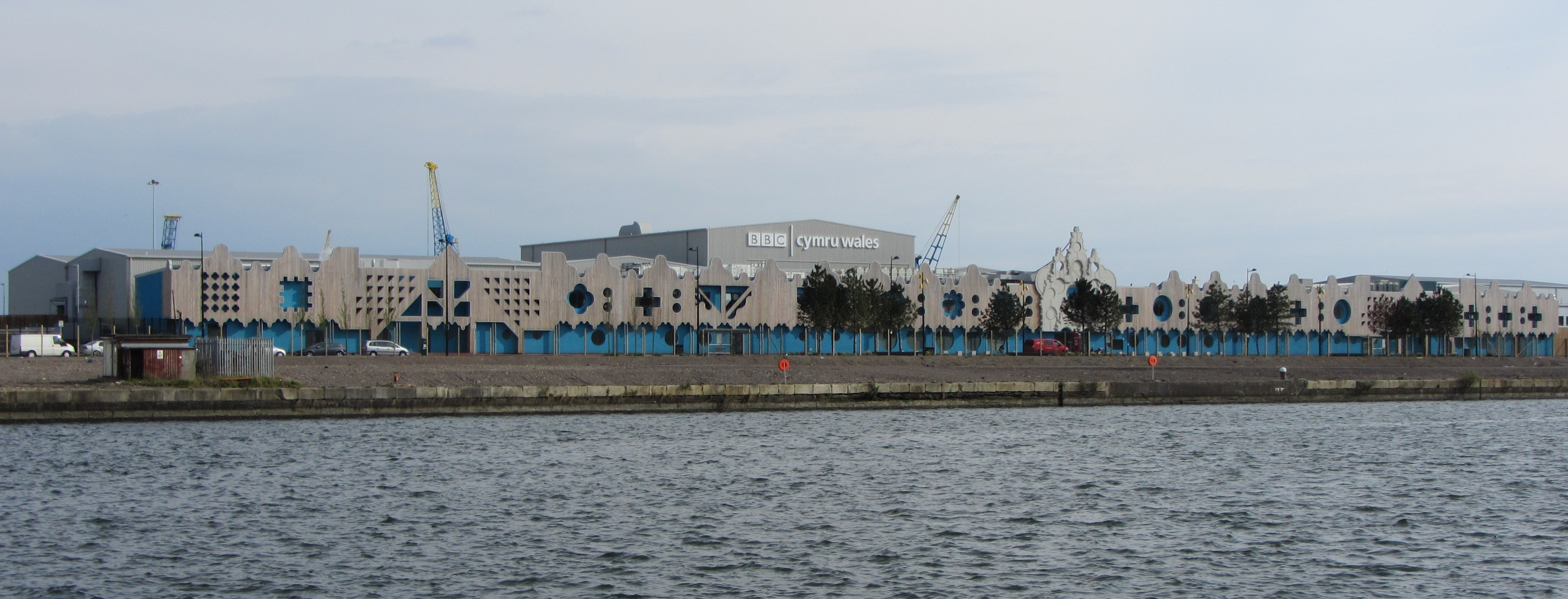
Series 37 is primarily filmed at Roath Lock Studios, located in Cardiff, where the serial has been produced since 2011.

The series commenced in the United Kingdom on 20 August 2022 on BBC One, a week after the conclusion to the previous series. It is produced by BBC Studios. Jon Sen continues his role as executive producer, having been appointed late in the previous series. Loretta Preece served as the show's series producer until episode 2, with Liza Mellody taking over from episode 3. This series marks the first one to return to regular filming protocols, following two series of restricted filming techniques due to the COVID-19 pandemic. Episode durations also return to the full 50 minutes, having been reduced to 40 minutes during the previous two series. Filming for Casualty primarily takes place in a purpose-built studio at the BBC Roath Lock Studios in Cardiff, although the nature of the show means that filming also takes place on-location. On-location filming often occurs in Cardiff and other areas of southern Wales. On-location sites used for series 37 include Dyfrid Street, Barry Island and Adamsdown Square, Cardiff.

=== Scheduling ===
Casualty normally airs weekly on BBC One on Saturday nights. The series has been marred by scheduling conflicts, which resulted in weeks without episodes and other weeks with double billings. In a piece on the future of the drama, Digital Spy's Sophie Dainty opined that these scheduling disruptions were "contributing to a descent in quality and momentum". The first double billing of the series contained episodes 3 and 4, both broadcast on 3 September 2022. The coverage of the death of Elizabeth II meant that episode 5 premiered on BBC Two on 10 September 2022, rather than BBC One as initially planned. The show took a transmission break following the broadcast of episode 8 on 8 October 2022. Cast members William Beck and Elinor Lawless confirmed that the show would return to transmission in November 2022, and episode 9 aired on 19 November, six weeks after the last episode.

=== Promotion ===
The series was promoted through a trailer released to the show's social media accounts. Calli Kitson from the Metro praised the trailer and called it "packed full of exciting storylines". She concluded, "Strap yourselves in! Watching the lives of hospital staff and patients unfold is never an easy ride..." The show's cast promoted the show during interviews with media outlets at the 2022 Inside Soap Awards. Sen gave an interview to the Metro's Duncan Lindsay, where he promoted the show's future. The twelfth episode, which is an improvised special, was advertised through a trailer released on 7 December 2022. The episode's main cast and production team also promoted the episode through interviews. A trailer was released on 9 February 2023 to promote new episodes of the series.

=== Format ===
Since its debut in 1986, Casualty has maintained a consistent format, which continues into this series. The format sees a minimum of one accident occur, which results in patients being admitted to Holby City Hospital's emergency department (ED), where they are treated by the show's regular characters. Alongside this, long-running story arcs took place across a series using the show's main cast. Following his appointment, Sen decided to alter the format of Casualty with changes taking place from January 2023. He removed the accident element of the show and instead had patients arrive at the hospital already injured. This move shifted focus to how patients were treated and their lives inside the hospital, rather than how they became injured. He said that he wanted to portray how the injury impacts a person's life. Sen was conscious that the audience may detach from the show if they are watching an inaccurate reflection of life.

Upon his appointment, Sen instilled five core values of "heart, wit, adrenaline, authenticity and entertainment" into the show's story team. He wanted to lead a focus on creating "Saturday night entertainment drama", drawing from the show's position in the schedule. In the show's new format, each series is split into "discrete mini-series" of 12 episodes. Each mini-series contains one main story arc running throughout with a handful of smaller stories "weaved in subtly". The first mini-series, In Plain Sight, running between episodes 13 and 25, follows Dylan working on an abuse case. The following mini-series, entitled Welcome to the Warzone, follows four new "fresh-faced" nurses as they join the ED. A time jump of six weeks occurs between the first and second mini-series, designed to enable development of character and story pace.

The decision to change the show's format stemmed from Sen wanting to adapt against "the level of competition from other channels and the proliferation of content". He did not want to exclude a fading audience to please long-term viewers and instead wanted to keep that audience through modernising the brand. He wanted to match other dramas in the way stories were told. Sen commented, "We may be a 37 year old brand but we aren’t predictable, boring, stale. We are exciting and modern." Sen wanted the new format to establish "serial drama in terms of hooks and long-term story". He felt this format allowed the audience to join into the series at any given point, rather than feeling they are unable to watch at all. Discussing the cast, Sen confirmed that the cast would remain consistent throughout the series and would not change regularly. However, this has been proven to be a deliberate misleading press statement as there have been nine changes to the cast throughout the series.

=== Story development ===
Stories from the show's previous series were continued into this series as part of the characters' ongoing development. David Hide (Jason Durr) takes a focus as his mental health is explored following the death of his son, Oliver Hide (Harry Collett). Writers reintroduced his former wife, Rosalene Hide (Jackie Knowles), as part of the story. Rachel Bavidge also reprises her guest role as Susan Kellmer, a patient with schizoaffective disorder, during the story. Durr explained that David and Susan connect on a "deep, mental level" and she would help David with his own "mental anguish" when she returns. Paige Allcott's (Shalisha James-Davis) BRCA1 diagnosis story continues into this series. Likewise, a feud between consultant Stevie Nash (Elinor Lawless) and anaesthetist Jonty Buchanan (Richard Harrington) is revisited, now with intervention from management consultant Marcus Fidel (Adam Sina).

A surrogacy storyline featuring Robyn Miller (Amanda Henderson), Marty Kirkby (Shaheen Jafargholi) and Adi Kapadia (Raj Bajaj) receives focus in the series. Through the story, Robyn's health is explored. Actor George Rainsford confirmed that his character Ethan Hardy would feature in a new story during the series, amid rumours circulating surrounding his exit. The opening episode leads a focus on the pressures of working in the NHS. Writers used the characters of Dylan Keogh (William Beck), Charlie Fairhead (Derek Thompson), Sah Brockner (Arin Smethurst) and Teddy Gowan (Milo Clarke) to highlight this. Through this focus, Sen wanted to reflect the everyday experiences of NHS staff in a "factual" manner rather than a "political" one. Actress Kirsty Mitchell told Alice Penwill of Inside Soap that her character Faith Cadogan's emotional state would be explored in this series, following a traumatic year. She also teased that the character would be given a love interest.

The topic of coercive control was explored in series 37 using the characters of Stevie and Marcus. The story begins when Stevie is attacked by a patient. Sen pointed out that this reflected the physical and verbal abuse NHS staff face daily. Lawless explained that the hospital is Stevie's "safe place" and the attack leaves her feeling "incredibly open, vulnerable, scared and childlike", the opposite of Stevie's characterisation. The attack pushes Stevie towards Marcus, who takes advantage of her vulnerability. Sen called the story "really fascinating to see", and Lawless opined that Stevie and Marcus' relationship is "definitely not what it seems".

At the Inside Soap Awards, Clarke revealed that the series would include a special episode exploring the paramedic team. He teased that it would "be fun and keep the audience on their toes". The actor later told Penwill (Inside Soap) that it was an improvised episode focusing on the "strain on the NHS", which he found "scary but fun". The episode is directed by Steve Hughes. Sen admitted to being worried about suggesting the episode to the cast, but was pleased when they were responsive and "threw themselves in with both feet". Discussing the creation of the episode, Sen told Duncan Lindsay from the Metro that the episode would be "the best way" to accurately reflect the pressure on the NHS, since queuing ambulances outside EDs was "a real defining visual". The show's research team had found that ambulance waiting times were a rising issues for the general audience, which led producers to focus on this. For the special, actors were given themes to improvise from. Sen opined that there was "a real live quality" and "an intimacy that's really released from those scenes". The cast had not been required to improvise for their work "for a while" but adapted to the challenge. Additionally, the show's medical advisory team worked closely with the cast to help them with their portrayal.

== Cast ==
The thirty-seventh series of Casualty features a cast of characters working for the NHS within the emergency department of Holby City Hospital and the Holby Ambulance Service. Most cast members from the previous series reprise their roles in this series.

William Beck appears as Dylan Keogh, the department's clinical lead and a consultant in emergency medicine. Di Botcher portrays Jan Jenning, the operational duty manager at Holby Ambulance Service. Milo Clarke stars as Theodore "Teddy" Gowan, a paramedic, and Jason Durr features as David Hide, the department's clinical nurse manager. Amanda Henderson and Shaheen Jafargholi both appear as staff nurses Robyn Miller and Marty Kirkby, respectively. Shalisha James-Davis plays Paige Allcott, an F1 doctor, and Elinor Lawless stars as consultant Stevie Nash. Kirsty Mitchell stars as Faith Cadogan, an advanced clinical practitioner (ACP), and Neet Mohan appears as Rash Masum, a clinical fellow. George Rainsford plays consultant Ethan Hardy, and both Arin Smethurst and Michael Stevenson feature as paramedics Sah Brockner and Iain Dean, respectively. Original cast member Derek Thompson appears as Charlie Fairhead, a senior charge nurse and emergency nurse practitioner. Charles Venn stars as Jacob Masters, a charge nurse.

Additionally, four actors appear in a recurring capacity: Raj Bajaj (social worker Adi Kapadia), Stirling Gallacher (Ffion Morgan, a police officer), Paul Popplewell (receptionist Paul Pegg) and Adam Sina (management consultant Marcus Fidel).

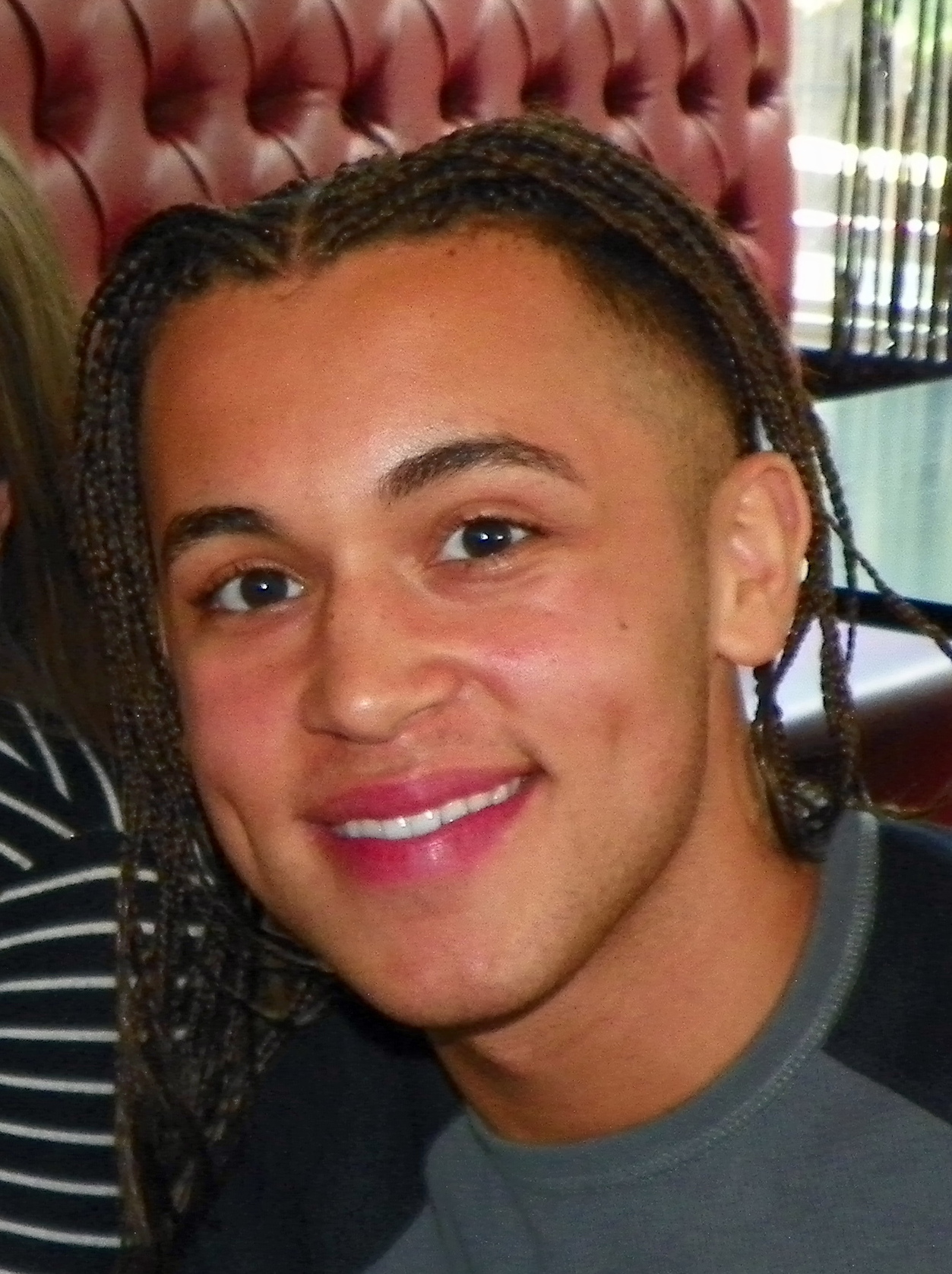
Shaheen Jafargholi left his role as Marty Kirkby during the series.

Bajaj exited the series in episode 8 at the conclusion of his character's story. On 31 October 2022, Durr announced his departure from the show via his social media accounts. He had played David for six years. Speculation arose in August 2022 that Rainsford had left his role as Ethan after nine years, following a series of social media posts. Three months later, Rainsford confirmed his departure. His exit features in episode 16, and following its broadcast, he explained that he decided to leave to spend more time with his family and explore new projects. Sen expressed hope that both Durr and Rainsford would return at a later date. Scenes in episode 19 suggested an impending departure for Robyn (Henderson), as observed by Grace Morris of What to Watch and Hannah Bird of Digital Spy. However, the show did not comment on this. The character was then killed-off in episode 23, which had been embargoed until transmission. Having portrayed Robyn since 2013, Henderson was the longest-serving female character on the cast. The actress later confirmed that it was not her decision to leave Casualty and that Robyn was killed-off to support other stories. The episode also featured the exits of David and Marty (Jafargholi). They both departed after Robyn's death, having become disilluisioned with the NHS. Jafargholi's departure had not been announced prior to transmission.

In September 2022, it was reported that Nigel Harman had begun filming a regular role on the show and would debut in 2023. He plays Max, who is billed as a "loveable rogue" who will "ruffle feathers" in some big stories for the show. Harman's casting was not officially confirmed until 7 February 2023. His character joins the ED as the new clinical lead and shares a backstory with Dylan. The role was created with Harman in mind; the actor found the decision to accept "easy" based on other actors' experiences on the serial. Max debuts in February. On 23 March 2023, it was announced that Jaye Jacobs would reprise her role as nurse Donna Jackson, joining the regular cast as a senior sister/clinical nurse manager. Jacobs had previously portrayed the character for 13 years on spin-off series Holby City until its cancellation, and had also previously guest starred on Casualty on multiple occasions. The actress expressed her joy at joining the drama. Donna returns in episode 26.

As part of the series' second mini-series, four new nurses were introduced. This concept was first mentioned in November 2022. The characters and their casting details were announced on 23 March 2023. Barney Walsh was cast as "accident prone" Cameron who is billed as "a perpetually terrified fish out of water". Walsh expressed his joy at working on the drama. Anna Chell joins the cast as "quick-witted and outgoing" Jodie, whose backstory will be explored and later revealed to be a midwife. Chell described Jodie as a "joy to play" and looked forward to her exploring her further. Sarah Seggari was introduced as "straight-talking and confident" Rida, who is the first hijab-wearing Muslim on the drama. Seggari noted that although Rida appears "abrasive", she is a carer "at her core". Eddie-Joe Robinson debuted as "ambitious and glory-hungry" Ryan, who struggles with the difference between school and working in the ED. Robinson called his casting "a fantastic experience" and dubbed Ryan a "cocky" nurse who is "a little misunderstood". Sen called the new nursing characters "a breath of fresh air" and hoped the audience would like them. The characters make their debut in episode 26.

The series features several recurring characters and multiple guest stars. Gordon Peaston and Alex Childs continue their guest role as Kevin Brockner and Jools Brockner, Sah's parents, in the series; they appear in episode six. Child actress Aurora Jones also continues her guest role as Charlotte Miller, the daughter of Robyn, in the series, appearing in episode 8. In a January 2023 interview with Thomas Lewis of the Daily Post, Jones' mother confirmed that Jones would appear in two more episodes. Her appearances in episodes 22 and 23 were part of Robyn's departure from the show. Jackie Knowles reprises her role as Rosalene Hide, David's former wife, following a brief appearance in series 36. She appears in the second episode of the series. Having previously appeared in a series 34 episode, Rachel Bavidge returns as patient Susan Kellmer as part of David's story. Bavidge appears in episodes two and five as a barista at the hospital café. Acclaimed actress Amanda Barrie guest stars in the series as care home patient Elsie Clegg, who is described as having "quite a way with words". The character initially appears in episodes 7 and 11. Barrie reprised the role for episodes 22 and 23. Richard Harrington returns to his role as consultant anesthetist Jonty Buchanan in this series too; he appears in episodes 8 and 14.

On 28 October 2022, it was confirmed that actor Bob Barrett would reprise his role of Sacha Levy in series 37. He previously played Sacha in Casualty's spinoff series Holby City until its cancellation in March 2022. Sen wanted to use the appearance of Sacha to attract the audience of Holby City. Sacha appears in episode 23 as part of Robyn's exit. Kriss Dosanjh and Shobu Kapoor reprised their recurring roles as Rash's father, Ashok Masum, and his partner, Mona Nadkarni. Appearing from episode 13, their story explores the topic of vascular dementia. Sheena Bhattessa joined the recurring cast as DCI Supriya Vadra from episode 13, appearing throughout the first mini-series. As part of Rainsford's exit from the series, Narinder Samra and Alison Dowling reprised their respective roles as Pen Khatri and Ashley Khatri, the maternal grandparents of Ethan's son Bodhi; they appear in episode 16. Episode 25 features the appearances of Faith's children: Natalia Malinovsky (Zoe Brough), Luka Malinovsky (Tom Mulheron) and Ana Malinovsky (Isla Merrick-Lawless); all three had made previous appearances in the drama. Davood Ghadami reprised his Holby City role as surgeon Eli Ebrahimi in episode 38.

=== Main characters ===
- William Beck as Dylan Keogh
- Di Botcher as Jan Jenning
- Milo Clarke as Teddy Gowan
- Jason Durr as David Hide (until episode 23)
- Amanda Henderson as Robyn Miller (until episode 23)
- Shaheen Jafargholi as Marty Kirkby (until episode 23)
- Shalisha James-Davis as Paige Allcott
- Elinor Lawless as Stevie Nash
- Kirsty Mitchell as Faith Cadogan
- Neet Mohan as Rash Masum
- George Rainsford as Ethan Hardy (until episode 16)
- Arin Smethurst as Sah Brockner
- Michael Stevenson as Iain Dean
- Derek Thompson as Charlie Fairhead
- Charles Venn as Jacob Masters
- Nigel Harman as Max Cristie (from episode 19)
- Anna Chell as Jodie Whyte (from episode 26)
- Jaye Jacobs as Donna Jackson (from episode 26)
- Eddie-Joe Robinson as Ryan Firth (from episode 26)
- Sarah Seggari as Rida Amaan (from episode 26)
- Barney Walsh as Cameron Mickelthwaite (from episode 26)

=== Recurring characters ===
- Ayesha Antoine as Billie Lawrence (episodes 32–36)
- Raj Bajaj as Adi Kapadia (episodes 3–8)
- Sheena Bhattessa as DCI Supriya Vadra (episodes 13–24)
- Connor Curren as Ashley Morgan (episodes 40–43)
- Kriss Dosanjh as Ashok Masum (episodes 13–40)
- Stirling Gallacher as Ffion Morgan (episodes 4–43)
- Susan Jameson as Freya Hall (episodes 34–36)
- Aurora Jones as Charlotte Miller (episodes 8–23)
- Paul Popplewell as Paul Pegg (episodes 1–23)
- Robert Pugh as Gethin West (episodes 27–43)
- Adam Sina as Marcus Fidel (episodes 2–21)

=== Guest characters ===
- Jack Ashton as Angus/Warren (episode 25)
- Bob Barrett as Sacha Levy (episode 23)
- Amanda Barrie as Elsie Clegg (episodes 7–23)
- Rachel Bavidge as Susan Kellmer (episodes 2 and 5)
- Michael Begley as Roy Welch (episodes 13 and 24)
- Zoe Brough as Natalia Malinovsky (episodes 25 and 28)
- Alex Childs as Jools Brockner (episode 6)
- Sam Cox as Keith Hutton (episodes 3 and 7)
- Lawton Dickens as DJ Hutton (episodes 3 and 7)
- Emilio Doorgasingh as Nadeem Bashir (episodes 14 and 17)
- Alison Dowling as Ashley Khatri (episode 16)
- Kerry Fitzgerald as Liv Hutton (episodes 3 and 7)
- Davood Ghadami as Eli Ebrahimi (episode 38)
- Anil Goutam as Krish Jethwani (episodes 27–28)
- Richard Harrington as Jonty Buchanan (episodes 8 and 14)
- Eiry Hughes as Kerrel Jones (episodes 24–25)
- Shobu Kapoor as Mona Nadkarni (episodes 13 and 14)
- Jackie Knowles as Rosalene Hide (episode 2)
- Keira Lucchesi as Kerry Morgan (episode 40–41)
- Carol MacReady as Mary Barrett (episodes 34–35)
- Isla Merrick-Lawless as Ana Malinovsky (episode 25)
- Tom Mulheron as Luka Malinovsky (episodes 25 and 36)
- Ben Owen-Jones as Ed Lewis (episode 38)
- Gordon Peaston as Kevin Brockner (episode 6)
- Narinder Samra as Pen Khatri (episode 16)
- Simone Saunders as Holly Cage (episode 21)
- Adam Seridji as Tristan Dalten (episode 5)
- Briana Shann as Mia Barron (episodes 39–40)
- Mia Streeks as Amber Baptiste (episode 40)
- Robin Weaver as Lizzie Barrett (episodes 34 and 41)

== Episodes ==
No. overall	No. in series	Title	Directed by	Written by	Original release date	UK viewers (millions)
1257	1	"All Time High"	Rick Platt	Colin Bytheway	20 August 2022	2.38
Charlie returns from a holiday in Greece full of optimism only to be confronted by teenage girl Manisha dying of a drug overdose in Resus, having been dumped on father Aabesh's doorstep. Brothers Daryl and Zac are setting up for a club night when Zac, who is on drugs, brings down some scaffolding. Daryl breaks his arm and Iain and Sah have to drag Zac clear with his legs crushed, at least one beyond saving. Charlie and Daryl realise Zac gave Manisha the drugs and Charlie convinces Daryl to go to the police. Charlie finds an old neighbour Toni, who has Crohn's disease, waiting in reception and finds her a quiet corner. He later finds she has been left alone for hours and collapsed in the toilet; she will now need a permanent ileostomy bag fitted, with may have been avoided if she'd been seen earlier. Charlie and Dylan vow to improve the hospital. David is trying to understand Ollie's actions and gets interested in the case of a woman injured trying to escape from jail, who tried to kill her husband with anti-freeze. However, he gets frustrated that she simply got fed up after twelve years of him constantly cheating on her. David burns Ollie's belongings. Guest starring Elliott Roberts, Ethan Roberts and Kammy Darweish
1258	2	"We Need to Talk About Ollie"	Rick Platt	Lindsey Alford	27 August 2022	2.39
A teenage boy tries to drive his younger brother to school but they crash and the younger brother is left needing surgery for a ruptured spleen. Teddy realises their mother isn't around. After the older boy is injured trying to look for her, he is sent into foster care, which his brother to join him when he recovers. Rosalene asks David to speak to a journalist to put Ollie's side of the story. Dylan, David and Paul realise a patient with apparent renal colic is actually the journalist under an assumed name. David treats Susan, a former nurse with bipolar who now runs the coffee cart, for a burned eye. A woman who was served an injunction for making 999 calls for company is brought in after taking an overdose and forced to accept people need ambulances. Dylan thanks Marcus for arranging overflow beds. Rosalene asks David for Ollie's things and he gives her one of the eyes from Ollie's teddy bear, the only things to survive being burnt. He meets Susan for a drink and keeps his past from her. Guest starring Gabriel Robinson, Corinna Marlowe and Nikhita Lesler
1259	3	"Falling"	Eric Styles	Ed Sellek	3 September 2022	2.35
An older woman goes out into the woods looking for her son, having forgotten he died of COVID. Her daughter-in-law and grandson track her down but the grandson ends up falling down a mineshaft. Teddy goes down to treat him but has difficulty putting in an artificial airway, possibly damaging his vocal cords, and then wrecks his leg and pelvis dragging him out. He ends up on ICU. Stevie is frustrated that Dylan deals with a set of darts-related injuries while she has two men who were attacked by a cat. Paul and Charlie both express doubts about Robyn's surrogacy arrangement on seeing the contract Adi has prepared but Robyn announces it to the staff. Liv, a drunk single mother, is brought in after a fall. Iain asks Adi to look into the case on learning she is homeless while Faith convinces her father Keith to let her and her son DJ move back in, unaware he is threatening her. Guest starring Emma Beattie, Isla Blair and Chris Morrison
1260	4	"Skin Deep"	Eric Styles	Jenny Davis and Rachel Harper	3 September 2022	N/A (<2.32) (Note: Not reported in the weekly top 50 programmes.)
A teenaged boyfriend and girlfriend try to run away together but the girl faints. At hospital, she is discovered to be pregnant. Marcus and the girl's mother summon Ffion; the mother wants the boyfriend charged with rape since the girl is only fifteen, even though he is only a year older. Stevie convinces her to leave the police out of it and give the boy a chance. A mentally handicapped man who recently moved into residential care is harassed by youths and then injured by a fire in his home which he makes little effort to extinguish. Robyn learns he is upset that a worker at his old care room hasn't visited him and gets the woman to visit and admit she is returning to Poland. Robyn rejects Paul's suggestion they get together after the surrogacy so he arranges a date with a cleaner instead. Stevie is annoyed when Dylan relieves her looking after a woman who fell over while drunk: She is actually an old friend of his from AA and dies in Resus. Marcus, now general manager, tells Stevie he is going to get rid of Dylan and she can take over. Guest starring Travis George, Moses Alexander and Tia May Watts
1261	5	"Derby Day"	George C Siougas	Toby Walton	10 September 2022	N/A (<2.64)
The department is flooded with opposing fans from a local football match. David and Robyn deal with a couple who support different teams and constantly bicker but insist they love each other. A man with a young daughter brought in with chest pains is harassed by an opposing fan. When the troublemaker causes trouble for Stevie, Faith and Robyn, the father steps in and pushes him onto broken glass, resulting in him facing questioning by the police. A policeman stabbed in the leg turns up on his horse which Paul looks after. Susan confronts David when a newspaper article identifies him as Ollie's dad. Rob's mother Zoe is brought in with a suspected overdose but it turns out she failed to take her epilepsy medication. David tells her and her husband Jack that Ollie and Rob are nothing to do with them but they insist they love Rob despite what he did, and Natalia's boyfriend Tristan tells David about Ollie sparing her. David apologises to Zoe, Jack and Susan before visiting Ollie's grave. Guest starring Amanda Horlock, Adam Byron and Elan Butler
1262	6	"Enough"	George C Siougas	Ciara Conway	17 September 2022	N/A (<2.97)
Sah's father Kevin is brought in after suffering a TIA. Sah is delayed when they and Jan pick up Brian, a cyclist who went through a window. They try and ban Jools from Kevin's bedside, despite learning the pair plan to remarry. Brian is awaiting sentencing after killing a woman while drink driving and tries to get his wife Dionne to let him see his sons. He takes Sah hostage and drives to the family home but finds it empty. He collapses from internal bleeding and is rushed back in for surgery, after which his family visit him. Sah joins Jools in keeping vigil over Kevin. Marcus provides a small number of bodycams for the staff. Dylan treats a man who has developed breasts after taking the contraceptive pill. Marcus ambushes Dylan at a board meeting, claiming the staff don't feel comfortable talking to him. Dylan meets an elderly woman with terminal cancer who refuses further treatment and sits with her as she dies. Guest starring Philip Correia, Leila Hoffman and Kieran Stokes
1263	7	"Coming Clean"	Carys Lewis	Colin Bytheway	1 October 2022	3.01
Liv Hutton flees home shortly before Keith is found stabbed inside by Iain and Teddy. DJ claims some intruders stabbed him but Keith says Liv did. Ffion brings Liv to the hospital after she is injured trying to steal a car, where she says Keith attacked her when she said she was moving out. DJ admits he stabbed Keith to stop him following Liv, and Iain and Faith convince Liv to return to the hospital for treatment and to support DJ. Faith befriends Elsie, a grumpy elderly woman. Robyn treats a woman who accidentally swallowed the engagement ring her boyfriend planted in a cupcake. Marcus tries to highlight a trolley shortage but Dylan quickly solves it. Robyn is planning to meet Marty and Adi for insemination before going to Charlotte's school play. The original plan is for them both to donate sperm but Adi convinces Marty to let him be the biological father, concerning Robyn. She later collapses in the hospital car park, coughing up blood. Guest starring Joe Ashman and Chloe Booyens
1264	8	"Just Between Us"	Carys Lewis	Charlotte Cromie	8 October 2022	N/A (<2.87)
A concerned Marty calls Paul, who finds Robyn collapsed. Dylan and Ethan she has had a pulmonary embolism, a rare side effect of IVF treatment. Paul attends Charlotte's play in Robyn's place and videos it for her. Robyn doesn't feel up to doing IVF again and Marty breaks up with Adi, who he realises wants children more than him. Robyn and Paul admit they love each other. Jonty turns up drunk at estranged wife Sian's house wanting to see his son and puts his hand through a window. Sian takes him to hospital where Paige wants him to be assessed by mental health but Marcus convinces Stevie to discharge him. Jonty is hit by a car outside and another car which swerved to avoid him is hit by a van. The mother and daughter inside were arguing about the daughter staying over with her boyfriend; it is implied the daughter was conceived when the mother was raped. Dylan criticises Stevie for discharging Jonty and Marcus fails to back her. Stevie counsels a pregnant woman with severe morning sickness considering an abortion but Jonty tells her she's not as good as she thinks she is. Guest starring Jessica Lee, Tamara Verhoven and Joanna Burnett
1265	9	"People Skills"	Candida Scott Knight	Michelle Lipton	19 November 2022	N/A (<2.90)
Paige is attending a gospel church when Saul, the husband of her friend Mercy, collapses outside. While they are tending to him, a van ploughs into the group and Mercy suffers a minor injury. Stevie asks Dylan to recommend her for the Jac Naylor Award but he feels she lacks people skills. Mercy is found to be pregnant. Saul is a former drug addict and hasn't told Mercy he is HIV positive. Stevie breaks patient confidentiality to tell her and her tests come back negative. The van driver, Carl, has far right tattoos. Ffion questions him about deliberately targeting the black congregation but he says he blacked out at the wheel. Rash tries to get Paige to say otherwise, even though she can't be certain. Carl has a seizure, confirming his story, but later viciously attacks Rash. Paige pulls out of meeting Rash's father. Marty brings in Adi's things, and has to retrieve them after Paul mistakes them for lost property, but ends up donating them to a homeless man when Adi doesn't want them. Stevie saves a girl who choked on a grape and Marcus recommends her for the award. Jan and Iain learn an old colleague has died on the verge of retirement. Guest starring Kiza Deen, George Eggay and Llyr Evans
1266	10	"Confidence and Paranoia"	Candida Scott Knight	Jodie Ashdown	26 November 2022	N/A (<2.53)
Stevie is due to be interviewed by the award panel and is disappointed that Dylan has recommended Ethan. A rap artist, Flo, is recording a video on train tracks with Jordan, her manager and boyfriend. She faints and has a fall. Stevie finds a supplement Jordan have her is actually PCP. Flo cuts ties with Jordan but refuses to report him. Jordan attacks Stevie when she is on the way to her interview and she ends up in Resus. She makes a statement to Ffion. The panel head, Moira, initially advises Stevie to apply next year but Marcus convinces her to put Stevie on the shortlist. Marty calls for social services to help a confused elderly woman and Adi's replacement turns up. Paul gets her name. Jan and Sah are called out to a family who have been in a car crash; the father is dead and the mother is trapped. They carry the daughter to safety, saying they'll come back for the mother, but the car explodes and kills her. Guest starring Bridget Marumo, Sam John and Jasmine Elamir
1267	11	"Leap of Faith"	Steve Hughes	Lisa McMullin	4 December 2022	N/A (<3.01)
Jan and Sah collect a man who got an egg stuck up his bottom on a stag night and have to stay outside the hospital with him until he passes it. They then attend a car accident where Jan suspects one of the drivers, who was mostly uninjured, was using his phone, and a woman who thinks she is having a heart attack but actually has panic attacks around dogs. Elsie is brought in after overdosing on beta blockers. An agency nurse, Donna, worries she double-dosed her but Faith realises she deliberately took an extra dose to get company, after Faith didn't visit her in a while. She turns down a dinner date with Iain to keep her company. Paige orders a CT scan on a patient with toothache. Stevie tries to overrule her but the results show the patient has a brain tumour. They later treat a body builder who dislocated a shoulder. Paige is left to manipulate it alone but tries to sedate her and sends her into respiratory arrest, then leaves her alone to get counter-medication, by which time she has been found and rushed into Resus. Dylan says Paige will have to be reported and Paige blame Stevie for making her try to impress her. Guest starring Sonny Ashbourne Serkis, Emi Wokoma and Tyler Dobbs
1268	12	"Thin Green Line"	Steve Hughes	Stephen McAteer	10 December 2022	N/A (<3.20)
The episode follows the paramedics over the course of four days. Jan and Teddy find a drunk, Robbie, in a pub garden who refuses transport. He later injures his hand breaking into his house looking for his girlfriend and Paul learns she has died. Jan and Teddy treat a woman who had an allergic reaction to nuts and Teddy makes several attempts to resuscitate her before they get her to hospital; it is unclear if she will be brain damaged or not. Teddy has to comfort a man who is self-harming on his own after the drug bag is stolen. Jan ignores a redirect order to collect an elderly man who fell and cut himself. At the scene of a multiple crash, Iain and Teddy have to help a woman give birth who went into labour on a bus. Jan gets into an argument with a young woman forced to wait, who films her rant and posts it online. Jan and Sah attend a woman who claimed to have had a stroke but instead asks them to get her some food, meaning they are late to attend a man in cardiac arrest who dies at the scene. They pick up Robbie, who is coughing up blood. Jan reverses to get around a parked car and runs over a young woman. Robbie dies in Resus and the young woman is rushed to theatre. Guest starring Russell Layton, Lisa Stevenson and Trevor Cooper
In Plain Sight
1269	13	"Start the Fire"	Thomas Hescott	Ed Sellek	7 January 2023	N/A (<3.33)
A number of casualties are brought in from a fire at a care home. Among them is Jemima, Dylan's old mentor. DCI Vadira is suspicious of her, since the fire started in a laundry room she went into. One resident dies after being found hiding in a cupboard and Jemima says she killed her, refusing treatment. Dylan finds a wound on Jemima's neck caused by the fire. She dies while he is in a meeting. He suspects her son Campbell of abusing her and Vadira agrees to look into it. Dylan finds a notebook of names and numbers in Jemima's belongings and photographs it. Ethan treats a staff member, Welch, for smoke inhalation. Rash treats a pair of bickering residents: It turns out the man has gonorrhea and the woman is one of his partners. Rash and Paige meet Ashok and Mona, with the latter having had her hand shut in the door while trying to stop Ashok leaving the house. Charlie tells Rash he thinks Ashok has dementia. Rash goes to the house and finds Mona moving out, saying she can't cope. Guest starring Souad Faress, Amir Boutrous and Debra Michaels
1270	14	"Fear Not"	Thomas Hescott	Rebekah Harrison	14 January 2023	N/A (<2.95)
A man goes into a DIY shop claiming to be the Son of God and shoots himself with a nail gun. David tracks down the vicar who runs a soup kitchen he frequents and she explains he is a paranoid schizophrenic and hasn't taken his medication. She is unable to talk him out of stabbing himself in the neck with scissors and Stevie is persuaded to comfort her. Rash takes Ashok to a consultant who feels he has vascular dementia. Ashok turns up at Mona's who takes him to the hospital. Rash is relieved to get support from Nadeem, an old family friend. Rash and Paige look after a homeless woman who Paige realises has toxic shock syndrome as a result of not being able to get tampons. Rash fails to read the ECG on a woman who collapsed while going to see her daughter and she has to be shocked after her heart slows, although he later arranges a visit from her daughter. The paramedics hear Jan has been cleared by tribunal. Dylan learns the investigation into Jemima's death has concluded and realises the numbers in her book are dates. Robyn and Paul meet Damian, an old classmate who has injured his arm. He persuades Paul to take over his business until he's recovered, which involves taking money from rich people to take their rubbish to the tip and then dumping it at the end of the street. Monty photographs Marcus and Stevie kissing. Marcus offers him a job at St James' if he deletes it but he instead reveals the relationship to the department. He and Marcus get into a scuffle which ends with him falling on a nail. Stevie leads the team saving him and he deletes the photo. Stevie breaks up with Marcus. Guest starring Sam Oladeinde, Sophia Capasso and Daniel Millar
1271	15	"Lost in Translation"	David Innes Edwards	Kevin Erlis and Hilary Frankland	21 January 2023	N/A (<2.96)
A boatful of migrants capsizes, washing survivors up on the beach. A man who was brought in with a young girl he saved from drowning is assumed to be her father but is actually a stranger to her. He explains to Jan he is a doctor who refused conscription; his wife was granted asylum but he was deported because of a mistake in his application. He has come back to try and talk his life out of leaving him but Sah insists he has to stay and comfort the girl, whose parents both drowned. Paige learns another survivor is worried about her girlfriend; she has never been able to be open about their relationship before. Paige reunites them. Sah is sympathetic towards a suspected shoplifter with palpitations until she steals from them. Stevie meets a man who fears his cancer has returned; she discovers his symptoms are down to taking supplements but his results apparently show he was right all along. She learns from him that she has been getting bad online reviews but is unaware Marcus is behind them. A number of casualties are brought in from a care home Marcus has ties to. It turns out they have been poisoned by a resident who used a plant from the garden containing aconite but Dylan discovers the woman in question has a scar on her neck like Jemima's and is kept locked in her room most of the time, reporting the home for abuse. Guest starring Ammar Haj Ahmad, Sedhar Chozam and Sakuntala Ramanee
1272	16	"Fight or Flight"	David Innes Edwards	Rachel Harper	4 February 2023	N/A (<2.89)
Iain and Teddy are called out to a young boy, Nathan, who has had acid thrown at him while being looked after by his father Ezra. Ezra admits to Ethan and Marty that he left a gang to look after Nathan and they don't want him to go. A youth, Brandon, is brought in with burnt hands and Ezra recognises him as the culprit. Ethan convinces him to go to the police rather than going after Brandon himself. Jacob attends a support group for abuse survivors. Another attendee, Bron, admits he is nervous around his boyfriend. Jacob tells him to be honest about his past but his boyfriend breaks up with him. Jacob arranges a date with May, an old colleague who came in after gluing her eyes shut, but backs off when she suggests going back to his. Paige treats Josh, a man with learning difficulties brought in by his friend James. He admits he was dealing drugs to get new friends but they beat him up. Dylan notices he has a wound on his neck like Jemima and Amina's. The report on the care home finds evidence of neglect but not abuse. Ethan's interview for the Jac Naylor Prize is interrupted when Ashley is brought in after arresting while looking after Bodhi. Marcus steals the USB stick for Stevie's presentation but she gets through the interview, ruining his plan to take her out to comfort her. Ethan is offered the prize but instead decides to resign to go away with Bodhi. Guest starring Connor Calland, Sarah Champion and Thomas O'Connell
1273	17	"IOU"	Enda Hughes	Becky Prestwich	11 February 2023	N/A (<2.94)
Ashok drives the wrong way down a motorway and hits a car carrying a young couple head on. The young woman is upset that her boyfriend got drunk and forced her to drive; she has spinal shock and needs surgery, while he has nerve damage in his arm. Dylan suspects Ashok has had a stroke. Rash learns Nadeem lost all Ashok's money with bad investments and they can't afford a care home. Paige has her disciplinary and is given a letter of advisement. Robyn notices Paul has a cut arm and he admits to doing a shift for Damian. She later sees him chatting to cleaner Trudy and learns they are both training as HCAs. Stevie treats a young dancer who fell through a glass table and has heart problems. Stevie realises her symptoms are down to taking diet pills and blames her mother, only for the girl to reveal she got them from someone in her class. Marcus gets the mother to make a complaint against Stevie and convinces Stevie that Faith has backed it up, leading to a falling out between the two women. Guest starring Ryan Hunter, Sophia Eleni and Danielle Walters
1274	18	"Running on Empty"	Enda Hughes	Claire Miller	11 February 2023	N/A (<2.94)
Jacob goes jogging and finds a man who has been stuck in a ravine with his leg trapped for three days. When Jacob is unable to summon help, they are forced to amputate his foot, with Jacob carrying him to safety. Jacob insists Marcus do something about staff shortages and the reliance on agency nurses. Paige is exhausted after a night looking after Ashok. Robyn asks her to look at a woman brought in from a wedding with suspected foot poisoning but Paige falls asleep in the on-call room, during which time the woman deteriorates and turns out to have meningitis. Paige later looks after a terminally ill man with pneumonia and takes him to see the stars. Dylan and David look after an elderly man who has been attacked. On hearing him arguing with his carer, Dylan realises a carer would have access to vulnerable patients and reports him to Supriya as the abuser, only to learn he set the man up with a male escort who attacked him. Marcus insists Dylan step down as clinical lead. Guest starring Isabel O'Regan, Devesh Kishore and Charlie MacGechan
1275	19	"Crash Landing"	Lance Kneeshaw	Rebekah Harrison	18 February 2023	N/A (<2.73)
The hospital declares a major incident after a train is derailed. Max Cristie, a doctor and old acquaintance of Dylan's who was at the scene, brings in an injured girl and later has to pacify her mother about removing her from the scene. Marcus gives Max a locum shift. A teenage girl is found to be having a miscarriage and Max suspects her football coach was the father after seeing them together; he is unable to get a confession so warns him not to go near any other girls. Paul, who is doing a trial HCA shift, tells Robyn he wants to ask her something. She fears he is going to propose but actually wants her and Charlotte to move to Wigan with him. They look after a baby who was knocked out of her pushchair; she is being looked after by her late mother's boyfriend, who feels he isn't up to the job, but with it clear the father isn't interested, Paul convinces him their bond is valid. Robyn proposes to Paul herself and he accepts. Stevie meets a patient whose ribs were injured by falling football boots. He insists on a male doctor but dies when an aortic aneurysm ruptures before Rash can see him. Marcus comforts Stevie and they kiss. Marcus hires Max as acting clinical lead. Guest starring Amelia Baldock, Moey Hassan and Ian Weichardt
1276	20	"Not Important"	Lance Kneeshaw	Hilary Frankland	25 February 2023	2.84
The episode takes place over the course of four days. Marcus is attacked in his car by a woman, Eloise, and Stevie comes to his rescue. Eloise is admitted as a voluntary psychiatric patient. Marcus claims she stalked him and made up a relationship, while Eloise claims he dated her in secret after her twin brother died, isolated her from her family, dumped her on their wedding day and pretended the relationship never happened. Stevie drugs Marcus and finds evidence of the relationship on his phone. Eloise discharges herself and dies after throwing herself in front of a car. Marcus deletes the evidence. Max bonds with Ivy, an initially rude teenager who comes in with minor injuries and whose mother has been looking after her alone. She is later dumped in front of the hospital; it transpires she has been smuggling drugs to pay the rent and a bag has burst inside her. Her depressed mother Carla makes it to the hospital to see her. Rash and Paige take Ashok on a tour of a care home. After treating an exhausted social worker with sepsis and possible pancreatic cancer, Rash wants to take out a loan to afford a better care home but Paige convinces Ashok to move into a cheaper one. Guest starring Angela Terence, Daisy Cooper-Kelly and Amy Searles
1277	21	"Pushover"	Matt Hilton	Hilary Frankland	4 March 2023	2.85
Rash is called to the care home after Ashok has locked himself in his room and stabbed a carer. Taken to the hospital, he manages to explain that he saw someone raping another resident at knife point and took the knife off him. Max suspects Dylan is trying to make up for failing to help a friend at university who committed suicide after being abused, but together they report what Ashok said to Supriya. Rash takes Ashok home and tells Paige they should break up. Stevie treats a young woman who had an elective mastectomy after her mother and sister died of breast cancer; her symptoms are down to an implant leaking but she also shows signs of cancer. Robyn meets a young woman who has rheumatoid arthritis and was hoping she was pregnant so she could get away from her overprotective mother. A man who was trampled by a police horse at a protest is found to have given a false identity when his details don't match his notes. He implies to Jacob that he is an undercover police officer. Jacob agrees to give Marty time off last minute but changes his mind on learning Marty wanted to go to a show. Stevie treats Stan, an IT expert with an irregular heart beat. She makes a statement about Marcus to HR but there isn't enough evidence to sack him and he refuses a transfer. Stevie meets Marcus for a drink and has Stan hack the contents of his phone, telling him she never wants to see him again. Guest starring Alexander Lobo Moreno, Jasmyn Banks and Evan Milton
1278	22	"Falling Down"	Paul Riordan	Gem Copping	11 March 2023	N/A
It's Robyn's last day and the staff are trying to throw a party for her but Jacob insists she work late. Robyn gets involved in the case of a young mum who brought in her son after a fall; her ex-husband has custody. Robyn fears there is something wrong with her but Jacob dismisses it; however, after she has left the hospital, it is discovered both she and her son have carbon monoxide poisoning and her ex has to rush her back in. A transgender teen who has been unable to get to a gender clinic has been injecting himself with testosterone and got an infection. Jacob just wants to treat it and discharge him but Marty gets him a psych referral. Faith and Iain are called out to an accident at a fairground, helping a father and daughter who have been impaled and a teenage boyfriend and girlfriend. The boyfriend has leukemia and Jacob has him placed in isolation, moving an elderly woman dying of heart failure into a corridor. He later turfs him out of the department on learning he is in remission and didn't say. Robyn lets him back in to see his girlfriend before walking out of the department. Jacob gives the cubicle to a surgical patient about to breach, leaving David tending to the dying woman in the staff room. Jacob closes the department to new admissions, leaving ambulance crews stuck outside. Faith and Iain share a kiss before she leaves to help Elsie, who is found lying drunk in the street with a cut leg. A call comes in about an RTC with the driver trapped inside but Jacob refuses to release an ambulance to attend, unaware the driver is Robyn. Guest starring Margaret Jackman, Melissa Parker and Anna Jobarteh
1279	23	"The Straw"	Paul Riordan	Michelle Lipton	18 March 2023	3.05
Faith takes Elsie back to the hospital for treatment and discovers a knife wound on her neck, realising she is one of the victims of abuse. Elsie identifies the community physio as the culprit. Robyn is cut out of her car by the fire brigade but they have a long wait for an ambulance to pick her up. When they get her to hospital, she is found to have internal bleeding. Sacha is brought down to treat her, with Max, Dylan and David volunteering to be his theatre staff. Rash and Marty meet a rowdy woman from a hen party who might have bone cancer. An elderly woman waiting to see her son and newborn grandchild suffers a stroke; Charlie and Rash thrombolyse her but she is left unable to speak, although they arrange a visit from her family. Charlie meets a teenager, Elliot, who is waiting on an ultrasound to have his central line fitted, and his father Patrick. Robyn dies in theatre after there is too much bleeding to control; David breaks the news to the staff and Charlie has to tell Paul and Charlotte. Marty clashes with a man waiting hours for an injured ankle to be seen to, although Rash later treats the man. Blaming Jacob for delaying Robyn's treatment, David and Marty resign in disgust and persuade the other nurses present to walk out with them, although Charlie, who Robyn left a phone message saying she was glad he was staying on, later returns to treat Elliot. Guest starring Jamie Kenna, Susan Bovell and Craig Gazey
1280	24	"No Regrets"	Cóilín Ó Scolaí	Hilary Frankland	25 March 2023	3.15
Supriya tracks down Welch at his home but ends up being stabbed by him. She crawls out into the street to attract attention and is rushed to hospital where Dylan treats her. Welch falls while running from the police and ends up impaled on a railing. Dylan saves him but Max, who initially intended not to apply for the permanent clinical lead job, feels Dylan has lost perspective and decides to stay on. Faith has volunteered to work while most of the staff are attending Robyn's funeral and Jacob ends up staying as well, feeling unable to attend. Faith helps a bride who has had an allergic reaction. Jacob treats a patient who has had a fall and has lost three sisters, his wife and son. Jacob is infuriated when the man says he hears spirits and has a message for him. The man later admits he is upset not to have heard from his son and reveals the message wasn't from Robyn but from Jacob's mother Omo. Jacob agrees to provide Kerrel, a drug addict with neck spasms, with diazepam but she later insists he didn't give it to her. It is only after she tries to break into the drug cabinet that Jacob realises she was telling the truth. In fact, Faith has stolen the drugs and takes them herself. Jacob hands in his resignation. Guest starring Paul McQuaid, Liza Goddard and Charlotte Mills
1281	25	"Baby, I Don't Care"	Cóilín Ó Scolaí	Ed Sellek	1 April 2023	2.91
Iain and Teddy bring in a father and daughter whose car crashed into a lake. The mother, who was driving, is missing and Faith looks after the daughter. A patient, Warren Genner, turns out to be the man who robbed Faith after sleeping with her the previous year, when he called himself Angus. Kerrel catches Faith taking drugs and tries to blackmail her into giving her pills. Faith tells her Warren gave her drugs to loosen her up and later raped her while she was unconscious. Kerrel attacks her in front of witnesses, losing her credibility, and later dies after trying to inject drugs into her femoral artery. The mother is found and investigated for drink driving. After failing to confess to Iain, Faith reports Warren to the police but continues taking drugs. Guest starring Kirsty Oswald, Annabel Hill and Warren Taylor
Welcome to the Warzone
1282	26	"Welcome to the Warzone"	Jamie Annett	Rachel Harper	8 April 2023	2.84
Donna is assigned to the ED as the new clinical nurse manager and welcomes four new nurses, Jodie, Cam, Rida and Ryan. Charlie gets Cam to nurse a man with a terminal heart condition. While moving the man's body, Cam leaves him unattended when Rida tells him about a hideout she's found for the new recruits, and Charlie moves the body to make a point to him. Jacob, meanwhile, has become a trainee paramedic and he and Iain bring in an old man who was attacked at a campsite. His grandchildren disagree over how to handle his attackers, and his granddaughter has to discuss organ donation when he is declared brain dead from a bleed on the brain. Jacob accompanies Iain and Teddy in visiting an old woman whose husband has died, convincing her to go to hospital to have a kidney infection treated, and locating a boy whose mother has collapsed from sepsis. It is revealed that, unknown to the rest of the staff, Jodie is Max's estranged daughter. Guest starring Emily Hindle, Ged McKenna and Ben Carolan
1283	27	"Pride and Prejudice"	Jamie Annett	Michelle Lipton	15 April 2023	2.59
Jan and Sah are called out to treat a homeless man sleeping rough at a car yard, who turns out to be Jan's ex-husband Gethin. Dylan sees something in his notes and tries to find him a place to stay. Jodie contacts Jan as his next of kin and she agrees to let him stay the night. Donna leaves her car in the car park to help a collapsed patient and it gets clamped. Dylan stops her paying the fine, saying he'll sort it, but fails to do anything and it gets towed. Jacob and Teddy are called to help Krish, an elderly shopkeeper being harassed by youths. Jacob is annoyed when they are called away to help a drunk whose wife recently died and Krish injures his hand in their absence. Jacob fixes the security camera at the shop. A pair of prison guards bring in two inmates from a female prison who were apparently in a fight. In fact, the male guard is in a relationship with one of them and stabbed the other as part of an escape plan. Even though his lover leaves him behind injured when she escapes, he refuses to give the police any information on her. Donna learns Ryan forged his references and gives him a day to prove himself. He takes on the case of a young woman with hearing problems. Cam suggests Ramsay Hunt syndrome but Ryan presents the diagnosis as his own, earning praise from Max and Donna but scorn from the other new nurses. Guest starring Richard Lumsden, Lucy Thackeray and Anne O'Riordan
1284	28	"With a Bullet"	Thomas Hescott	Rebekah Harrison	22 April 2023	2.72
Jacob ignores a distress call from Krish, who is being menaced in the shop. He and Iain are called out to Craig, who is handcuffed to a bed with heart problems after some men he invited back convinced him to take cocaine. He recently lost his long-term partner. Krish calls Teddy and Sah to look after a gang member he beat with his own baseball bat, but Teddy finds another gang member shot dead and Krish takes them hostage. Overhearing by the panic button, Jacob abandons Iain and Craig to help and Craig later dies. Krish reveals he only meant to spend a year in the country to raise money but kept being harassed and robbed. Teddy nearly talks him down when Jacob barges in and Teddy is shot and wounded while shielding Sah. The police take charge of the situation and both Teddy and the gang member recover. Jan attempts to lecture a pregnant woman with Down syndrome but Rida defends the patient, who eventually explains to Rash that she has stopped taking her heart medication. He refers her to a specialist. Gethin tells Jan he has motor neuron disease and asks her not to tell Ffion. Dylan learns Donna is without a car and offers to drive her. Faith encounters a teenager drunk on vodka his mother gave him. She confiscates a vape but his mother gives it back to him, admitting she has four children and it's easy to let him do whatever he wants. He is brought back in after the vape explodes in his face. Faith has been keeping her relationship with Iain from the children but, when Natalia tells her they know and are fine with it, she invites him round for dinner. Guest starring Neil Ashton, Bethany Asher and Travis George
1285	29	"Screwdriver"	Thomas Hescott	Ed Sellek	29 April 2023	2.70
Stevie fails to save a teenage girl who was stabbed in the neck with a screwdriver by a boy who was jealous of her getting a prestige work placement and Max notes she has a high mortality rate. Ffion arranges for Gethin to do a decorating job but he is unable to lift a brush. A boy, Tobey, goes to him for help when his friend Travis is caught in a frozen lake trying to retrieve a bag. Gethin dives in to help him and they both end up in hospital where Stevie saves Travis, who gets a kiss from Tobey. Gethin tells Ffion about his MND. Donna and Dylan treat a woman who burnt herself on a candle after passing out and is awaiting a lung transplant. Donna catches her smoking but keeps quiet after she insists it's her first in four years. Jacob and Sah treat Barnaby, a young man gored by a bull. It transpires his friend Chris provoked the incident for an online video and now intends to ditch Barnaby after getting sponsorship. Jacob visits Teddy. Guest starring Joanna Brookes, Debbie Korley and Farshid Rokey
1286	30	"Keep Breathing"	Sean Healy	Toby Walton	6 May 2023	2.07
A patient is brought in after being found collapsed in the mudflats, but when Ryan knocks over his bag it turns out he was collecting grenades, including a phosphour grenade which will explode on contact with air. The department is evacuated but Dylan, Donna, Jodie and Ryan carry on treating the patient in the meantime. Max and Faith treat a boy who was hit by a car while the evacuation is taking place. It turns out he ran out into the road in order to get away from his parents arguing. Faith comes up with an excuse to re-enter the department and pockets more drugs. Cam organises a treatment tent in the car park and reassures a patient who thinks he's having a heart attack. Ryan has to hold the grenade together when it cracks but he panics and Jodie takes over. Bomb disposal squad sergeant Jed tries to help her get it to a water tank they've set up, but when it starts smoking he sends her to safety and smothers the explosion, being badly burned. Ryan overhears Jodie and Max talking and realises they have a connection. Guest starring Ciaran Kellgren, Ro Kumar and Oliver Jackson
1287	31	"Believe Me"	Sean Healy	Rebekah Harrison	20 May 2023	2.59
Faith learns her rape case isn't being taken any further. She is short with Cam while treating an air hostess who has suffered a pulmonary embolism but later softens. The hostess' girlfriend, who wanted an open relationship, is upset to find she's also seeing a man and they agree to be exclusive. Faith agrees to Iain's suggestion of a family holiday. Max bans Ryan from Resus, even when he diagnoses a boy he's treating with meningitis. Ryan tells Cam that Max is sleeping with Jodie. A hot dog stand owner is brought in after suffering an asthma attack and is surprised when his son visits after clearing up the stand. After a number of misunderstandings, Teddy arranges a date with Paige. Jodie is meant to be meeting Rida for a drink but Rida is delayed. She gets talking to a man, Noah, who spikes her drink and tries to abduct her. Jodie manages to call Rida, who chases Noah off. Faith and Rida treat Jodie on the quiet. Max sees her and assumes she's drunk, trying to get all the new nurses banned from Resus until Faith puts him and Donna straight. Jodie decides to go to the police. Guest starring Perry Benson, Sherelle Armstrong and Kat Rooney
1288	32	"Once Bitten"	Duncan Foster	Rachel Harper	27 May 2023	2.56
Iain, Teddy and Jacob are called out to a building where a maintenance man is dangling over the side, after being attacked by a woman smashing the phone mast. Jacob refuses to help rescue him, wanting to wait for the fire brigade, and the rope snaps while Iain and Teddy are trying to pull him to safety, leaving him with permanent back and spinal injuries. Iain stands Jacob down for the day. The woman is brought in after suffering an electric shock and her husband explains she blamed the phone mast for their daughter dying of cancer. Jacob talks her into coming back into hospital after she discharges herself with heart problems. After meeting a beach singer who got into a fight over his takings, Jan tries to improve Gethin's spirits with a day at the seaside. A man is brought in after being bitten by one of his pet snakes. The snake gets loose in the department and bites Faith, who is given the anti-venom along with the other patient but refuses painkillers. Cam enlists Jodie to capture the snake, saving a concussion patient who had earlier given him a hard time. A depressed Jacob confides in barmaid Billie. Guest starring Connor Byrne, Louis Emerick and Alun Raglan
1289	33	"Armour-Plated"	Duncan Foster	Becky Prestwich	3 June 2023	2.76
Iain and Jacob are called out to a motorway pile-up caused by a youth jumping off a bridge. Jacob rushes the jumper to surgery while Iain, having flashbacks to Sam and Mia dying, treats a family in a camper van. The husband turns out to have a haemopneumothorax and needs surgery; his wife admits she was going to leave him. Faith gets frustrated with a teenage girl who is rude to her and palms her off on Jodie. The girl later turns up with a detached retina after being beaten up and Stevie recalls treating her after a fight in a children's home. Faith contacts social services about the girl. Max, Jodie and Rida treat a young ice hockey player who keeps vomiting. He turns out to have taken "medicine" that would supposedly stop him being gay. Max convinces him to be honest with his father but it results in his father throwing him out and Max comforting the young man. Cam treats a couple who have taken ecstasy. He learns his grandmother is going into a home and is considering selling the house where he lives. Jodie and Rida decide to move in as lodgers instead. Jodie is recommended for a commendation and is annoyed that her friends assume Max did it when in fact it was Stevie. Sah gets a date for their top surgery, reminding Paige of her own decision about the BRCA gene. Guest starring Tom Lister, Polly Frame and Milo Callaghan
1290	34	"Separation"	Enda Hughes	Jamie Davis	10 June 2023	2.59
A young Asian woman is brought in after falling through a window during a police raid on her nail bar; the police suspect she is a people smuggler. She ends up setting off a tear gas bomb belonging to another patient in Resus so her sister can escape. Stevie tells Jodie to give antibiotics to Freya Hall, who was bit by a dog, but Jodie just gives her a tetanus injection and discharges her. Max covers the incident up. Cam gets into trouble for failing to find a vein on a patient. Iain and Jacob pick up a man who collapsed in an argument with his cheating wife from the bar where Billie works. Jacob later goes back and kisses Billie. The patient turns out to have a bleed on the brain and needs surgery. Jan and Teddy bring in an elderly terminally ill woman, Mary, whose breast cancer has spread to her lungs. Even though Dylan knows she can't be saved, her daughter Lizzie insists he resuscitate her and put her on life support. Jan takes Mary's medication for Gethin. Guest starring Jonny Burman, Kattreya Scheurer-Smith and Rumi Sutton
1291	35	"Deliverance"	Enda Hughes	Erin Kubicki	17 June 2023	2.72
Jan leaves Gethin alone with the medication to take his life with. A courier bike taking a donor heart to the hospital is hit by a lorry after stopping behind a broken down vehicle. Jan tries to rush the donor heart to hospital but learns it was bruised and couldn't be used. Dylan learns the lorry driver kept on driving despite being diagnosed with macular disease and Jan berates him. Faith helps treat a man who suffered chest damage on being hit by a football and comforts his wife when he dies. A teenager is brought in after being stabbed; he is a former gang member who turned police informer. His younger brother, who is being threatened by the gang, attempts to finish him off with a gun but his mother talks him down and summons the police. Freya complains to Donna about being sent home without antibiotics. Stevie admits she didn't give a written prescription but Jodie finds she did make a note. Max advises her to keep quiet and Jodie ends up sleeping with Ryan. Jan returns home to find Gethin vomited the medication and Ffion knows what happened. Ffion walks out. Guest starring Barry Aird, Lara Sawalha and Lambro Demetriou
1292	36	"Lose Yourself"	Conor Morrissey	Ciara Conway	24 June 2023	2.46
Faith is interrupted by Luka and his friend Johnny when about to drink some drugs mixed with orange juice. She later finds Johnny fitting and rushes him to hospital, telling Paige he took an overdose of ADHD medication. Dylan quickly realises he actually has meningitis and has to talk his mother out of making a complaint. Faith and Ryan treat a man for a head injury from a fall from a horse. Stevie and Ryan treat a ballerina who has fractured her wrist and is hoping to get to an audition in Edinburgh. They discover she left an old ankle injury untreated, taking painkillers, and she is convinced to stay in. Freya gives Ryan a bottle for Max, believing Stevie was to blame for her being sent home. Rida realises Jodie slept with Ryan. On hearing Jodie talking dismissively of him, Ryan tells Stevie, who tears a strip off Max and Jodie in front of the other staff. Jacob brings in a teenage girl who injured her hand punching a window. He discovers her mother has depression and convinces her to stay in the hospital. He goes to see Billie and learns she talks to men on the internet for money. She throws him out, feeling he will never understand. Sah learns their top surgery has been postponed, possibly for as much as a year. Iain sees Faith with a nose bleed and finds her drugs hidden in the toilet cistern. Guest starring Jayne McKenna, Ben Shorrock and Will Kenning
1293	37	"Burning Bridges"	Conor Morrissey	Hilary Frankland	1 July 2023	2.62
Max learns Jodie has resigned and admits to Dylan that she's his daughter. Dylan encourages him to try and help a teenage boy injured while sleeping in a skip after his stepfather threw him out. Iain meets a teenage girl who was in a fight at school; he initially believes she was standing up to bullies but Jacob realises she is racist. Her mother admits she was radicalised by people she spoke to online but refuses to report her to the police. Iain agrees to keep quiet about Faith's addiction. Donna challenges the new nurses to improve. Jodie saves a boy, Alfie, and his father James invites her and her friends to hold a farewell drinks at his pub. Jodie argues with Cam and Ryan, then the kitchen explodes, with Rida trying to help James. Cam and Ryan get a casualty to hospital and help Rash cannulate a needlephobic patient. Max rushes into the pub looking for Jodie and sends Rida to safety while he helps James. He ends up being hit by a beam and suffering lung damage; Jodie turns out to have taken Alfie out before the fire started. Paige and Sah run triage outside and share a kiss. Dylan tells the rest of the staff Jodie is Max's daughter as she keeps vigil at his bedside. Guest starring Liam Jeavons, Jake Williams and Jonah York
1294	38	"How to Save a Life"	Steve Hughes	Jay Kumar	15 July 2023	2.60
Teddy and Jan go to help Amartya, a motorcyclist left trapped under a vehicle by an accident, before Iain flies him to the hospital. Stevie and Dylan have just lost a patient who had a severe asthma attack, with Stevie having to tell his parents and being short with a patient who has a bee sting. The Resus team work on Amartya when he arrives and discovers a chest injury has caused heart damage. Cardiothoracic surgeon Eli Ebrahimi operates and save his life before orthopaedic surgeon Rob Watts has to amputate his leg. Ryan treats a woman who fell and broke her leg on her 75th birthday and arranges a visit from her son and his family. Note: The episode is interspersed with interviews with real-life NHS workers. Guest starring Taqi Nazeer, Nicola Stuart-Hill and Keir Charles
Driving Force
1295	39	"Hooke's Law"	Christopher McGill	Al Smith	22 July 2023	2.76
Donna agrees to stay back and do another shift, asking Mia to look after Amber. She ends up spending most of the shift trying to keep track of an elderly woman with dementia, who disappears every time her transport shows up. Faith steals a urine sample from a teenager who collapsed at the bus stop to pass a drug test with Iain. The girl appears to be in labour but just delivers the placenta, meaning she has already had the baby. She admits to abandoning her daughter at a youth club, where Iain finds her unharmed. Paige tries to convince the teen she can be a mother and go to medical school. An Arabic man who speaks little English brings in his wife with a suspected stroke. Rida works out she is pregnant and Dylan performs an emergency caesarean but the mother dies from a brain bleed. Rida fails to act as translator when Donna breaks the news and the man brings in his neighbour to translate. The staff are unable to release the body for immediate burial. Cameron correctly diagnoses a clot. Ffion calls out Jan and Teddy when a colleague suffers an arterial bleed on her foot after standing on a nail. Jan and Ffion make up, and Ffion agrees to take Gethin to a clinic in Switzerland without Jan's knowledge. Donna hears Mia has left Amber alone and tries to drive home but falls asleep at the wheel and causes another car to crash. Guest starring Aso Sherabayani, Ramzi Dehani and Alice Darling
1296	40	"Little White Lies"	Christopher McGill	Michelle Lipton	29 July 2023	2.83
Donna argues with the other driver, Ashley, whose drunken mother Kerry is a passenger and threatens to sue Donna for invented injuries. Iain and the police arrive and Donna claims she saw the car swerve and crash, and stopped to help. Kerry is arrested for drink driving; Ashley has no license and she was meant to be supervising him. She later suffers a bleed on the brain and ends up in ITU, with it uncertain if she will survive. Donna sees Ashley arrested but her attention is drawn to Mia's arrival with Amber, who burnt herself trying to make hot chocolate. Jan and Teddy are called out to Scott Baker, who has been self-harming again, and Jan talks him into coming to hospital. She is later set upon by a gang of youths who steal the ambulance and admits to Ffion she is thinking of retiring. Teddy breaks up with Paige. Ryan looks after an old man with a broken hip which turns out to be down to advanced cancer weakening his bones. He and Cameron end up looking after the man's dog. Stevie tells Cameron to cut the clothes off a woman with a dislocated shoulder, who admits she bought the clothes on credit card for a school reunion and needs to return them. Donna helps her by unpicking the stitch. Rash confides in Rida about Ashok, who no longer recognises him. Guest starring Lucas Button, Amy Robbins and Kai Owen
1297	41	"Dog Days"	Ian Barnes	Ed Sellek	5 August 2023	2.60
Iain and Jacob attend a collision between a minibus and a car. The mother and son in the car are keen not to be separated. The boy is revealed to have a genetic blood disorder. The mother first claims she adopted him after a miscarriage but later admits she took him when she found him left in a car as a baby. The boy's birth family is traced. Paige insists on working on her mother's birthday and finds herself treating a woman found collapsed, who turns out to have a terminal brain tumour. Teddy and Paige make up after reuniting her with her dog. Jan and Teddy find Lizzie Weaver drunk in the street after her mother died. When she sobers up, she is upset to find herself in the hospital. Max goes to see a specialist and Dylan realises he is in kidney failure again. Max distances himself from Jodie. Guest starring Sally Scott, Aydin Ali and Laurence Bouvard
1298	42	"Pull Together, Push Apart"	Ian Barnes	Poz Watson	12 August 2023	2.56
A crowd at a rave have been sprayed with acid. A woman with a badly burned face is brought in accompanied by her girlfriend; her ex-husband also comes in to see her. Although she initially sends them both away, she lets her girlfriend accompany her up to the ward. Iain and Jacob are accosted by a homeless man, Joe, who asks them to look at his friend and then steals their bag. They track him down and find he has overdosed and also caused his friend's injuries during an argument. He takes Iain hostage in an attempt to get more drugs but Jacob talks him down. Jacob learns he is now a fully qualified paramedic. Donna finds Ashley has been brought in after self-harming and that he has lost his job for being unable to drive. She gives him some food. Ryan gets talking to a young man in a wheelchair whose friends have abandoned him, which prompts him to try and make up with Cam. Max instigates a new counter-signing procedure to combat diazepam going missing. Faith gets Stevie to counter-sign a prescription for an elderly cancer patient then takes some of it for herself. When Stevie finds out, Faith lies that she has ovarian cancer. Guest starring Kirsty Stuart, Stella Taylor and Micah Balfour
1299	43	"Too Young, Too Soon"	Michael Lacey	Kevin Rundle	19 August 2023	2.46
Casualties are brought in from a music festival including a middle-aged man who had a reaction to some bad ecstasy, to his son's bemusement. A teenage boy dies of the same reaction and his mother, a prison guard, arrives to identify the body. Rash looks after a woman who thinks she has had a stroke but actually just fell asleep on her arm and unsuccessfully flirts with her. Rida offers to find him a girlfriend. Stevie offers to support Faith through her supposed cancer. Ffion and Gethin are planning for the trip to Switzerland, with Jan thinking they're moving to France. Jan and Ffion are called around to help their neighbour and her boyfriend with a home water birth. The woman ends up being taken to hospital with bleeding but later recovers. At her retirement party, Jan learns of Ffion and Gethin's plan and throws Ffion out. Donna finds Ashley self-harming again and gives him money for rent. She hears Kerry is being taken off the ventilator to test for brain death and confesses to Max, who advises her to keep quiet. Although Ashley tries to contact her to let her know Kerry is breathing on her own, Donna goes to the police and confesses. Guest starring Gary Turner, Cariad Hargan-Hughes and Dan Partridge

== Reception ==
Casualty won the 2022 Rose d'Or award in the Soap or Telenova category, after beating ten other international nominees. The show was also nominated for the Best Soap/Continuing Drama award at the 2023 Broadcast Awards.

Kitson of the Metro praised the series' opening episode and felt the focus on the NHS was "a very real, very powerful way to open a series". She opined that the audience had to "face hard truths in a very powerful and brutal way". In a feature for the publication, the opening episode was praised by Ed Hope, an ED doctor, and Joel Phillips, a paramedic. They both agreed that it reflected the current state of the NHS well, despite looking like a "dystopian fiction". Phillips also noted how the serial mirrored the NHS by highlighting "the impact relentless pressure is having on NHS employees". Kitson's colleague, Sue Haasler, called the opener "gritty". Television magazine What's on TV listed the opening episode in its television highlights of the week.

In a feature on Casualty's future following the cancellation of sister show Holby City, Dainty from Digital Spy criticised the show, "We're not going to beat around the bush – Casualty is not what it used to be." She thought that 2022 (series 36 and 37) was "one of the most turbulent years in its 36-year history", which worried her. Dainty accredited the show's decline to scheduling disruption and "a palpable lack of publicity". She suggested that the BBC could utilise catch-up service BBC iPlayer to premiere episodes, in such a way that has been used for BBC soap opera EastEnders when they faced scheduling disruption. Examining the show's ratings, the reporter noted that viewing figures of series 37 were down approximately 400,000 viewers compared to series 36 episodes broadcast at the same time. In addition to a rating decline, she thought that storylines were facing "pacing problems" and a lack of "momentum", and named David's mental health story, Paige's BRCA story and the surrogacy plot as storylines which have suffered as a result. Despite her criticism, Dainty praised both Casualty and Holby City for being "ahead of the curve in terms of diverse casting and storylines". She believed that series 37 offered "great potential" by returning to the show's roots with a focus on the NHS.
