= Casualty series 41 =

Series 41 of Casualty

Casualty
- Series 41
- Starring: William Beck; Di Botcher; Anna Chell; Milo Clarke; Sammy T. Dobson; Melanie Hill; Aron Julius; Elinor Lawless; Kirsty Mitchell; Neet Mohan; Olly Rix; Sarah Seggari; Michael Stevenson; Charles Venn; Naomi Wakszlak; Barney Walsh

Release
- Original network: BBC One; BBC One HD

Series chronology
- ← Previous; Series 40

The forty-first series of the British medical drama television series Casualty is expected to air in the United Kingdom on BBC One in 2027. The series focuses on the professional and personal lives of medical and ancillary staff at the emergency department (ED) of the fictional Holby City Hospital. Roxanne Harvey is expected to serve as executive producer, with Liza Mellody continuing as series producer.

== Production ==
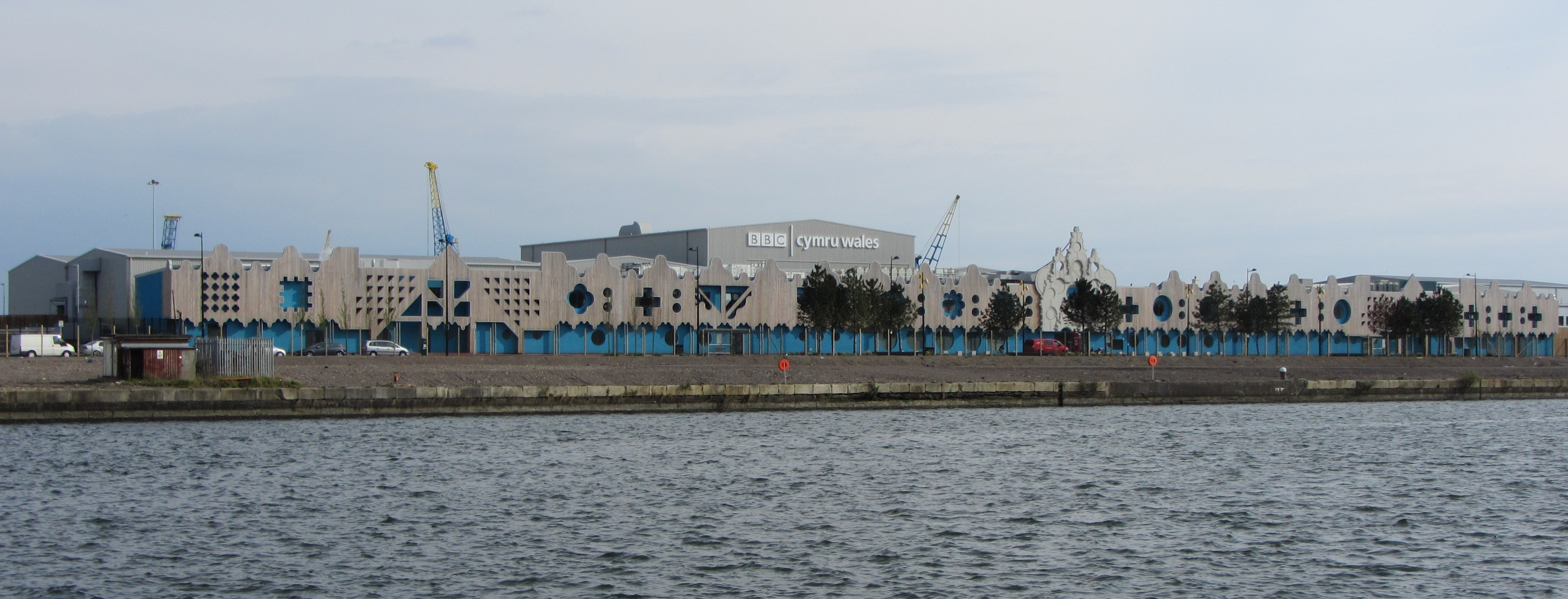
Series 41 is primarily filmed at Roath Lock Studios, located in Cardiff, where the serial has been produced since 2011.

From episodes broadcast in 2027, Roath Lock Studios will remain as the production base for Casualty, but the series' fictional setting will move from Holby to a hospital in Wales. BBC Studios successfully bid to continue as the production company for the next three series starting with series 41.

== Cast ==
The forty-first series of Casualty features a cast of characters working for the NHS within the emergency department of Holby City Hospital and the Holby Ambulance Service. Sixteen main characters are expected to return from the previous series but are yet to be confirmed.

William Beck appears as senior consultant in emergency medicine Dylan Keogh with Di Botcher portraying Jan Jenning, the operational duty manager at Holby Ambulance Service. Anna Chell stars as staff nurse and midwife Jodie Whyte with Milo Clarke playing paramedic Teddy Gowan. Sammy T. Dobson continues as speciality registrar in emergency medicine Nicole Piper with Melanie Hill portraying senior sister and clinical nurse manager Siobhan McKenzie. Aron Julius continues as F2 resident doctor Matty Linlaker. Elinor Lawless stars as consultant Stevie Nash with Kirsty Mitchell portraying Faith Cadogan, an advanced clinical practitioner (ACP). Neet Mohan plays consultant Rash Masum with Sarah Seggari as senior staff nurse Rida Amaan. Olly Rix plays clinical lead Flynn Byron. Michael Stevenson, Charles Venn and Naomi Wakszlak star as paramedics Iain Dean, Jacob Masters and Indie Jankowski respectively. Barney Walsh stars as staff nurse Cameron Mickelthwaite.

=== Main characters ===
- William Beck as Dylan Keogh
- Di Botcher as Jan Jenning
- Anna Chell as Jodie Whyte
- Milo Clarke as Teddy Gowan
- Sammy T. Dobson as Nicole Piper
- Melanie Hill as Siobhan McKenzie
- Aron Julius as Matty Linlaker
- Elinor Lawless as Stevie Nash
- Kirsty Mitchell as Faith Dean
- Neet Mohan as Rash Masum
- Olly Rix as Flynn Byron
- Sarah Seggari as Rida Amaan
- Michael Stevenson as Iain Dean
- Charles Venn as Jacob Masters
- Naomi Wakszlak as Indie Jankowski
- Barney Walsh as Cameron Mickelthwaite

=== Recurring characters ===
TBC

=== Guest characters ===
TBC

== Episodes ==
No. overall	No. in series	Title	Directed by	Written by	Original release date	UK viewers (millions)
1404	1	TBA	TBA	TBA	TBA	TBD
