= Casualty series 38 =

Casualty
- Series 38
- Starring: Manpreet Bachu; William Beck; Di Botcher; Anna Chell; Milo Clarke; Sammy T. Dobson; Jamie Glover; Nigel Harman; Melanie Hill; Shalisha James-Davis; Jaye Jacobs; Elinor Lawless; Kirsty Mitchell; Neet Mohan; Adesuwa Oni; Eddie-Joe Robinson; Sarah Seggari; Kellie Shirley; Arin Smethurst; Michael Stevenson; Derek Thompson; Charles Venn; Barney Walsh
- No. of episodes: 36

Release
- Original network: BBC One; BBC One HD
- Original release: 26 August 2023 – 3 August 2024

Series chronology
- ← Previous; Series 37 Next → Series 39

The thirty-eighth series of the British medical drama television series Casualty commenced airing in the United Kingdom on BBC One on 26 August 2023 and finished on 3 August 2024. The series focuses on the professional and personal lives of medical and ancillary staff at the emergency department (ED) of the fictional Holby City Hospital. Jon Sen and Liza Mellody continued their roles as executive producer and series producer respectively. Series 38 consists of four mini-series: Driving Force, A History of Violence, Breaking Point and Storm Damage. The series also features the departure of the show's longest-serving character, Charlie Fairhead (Derek Thompson).

== Production ==
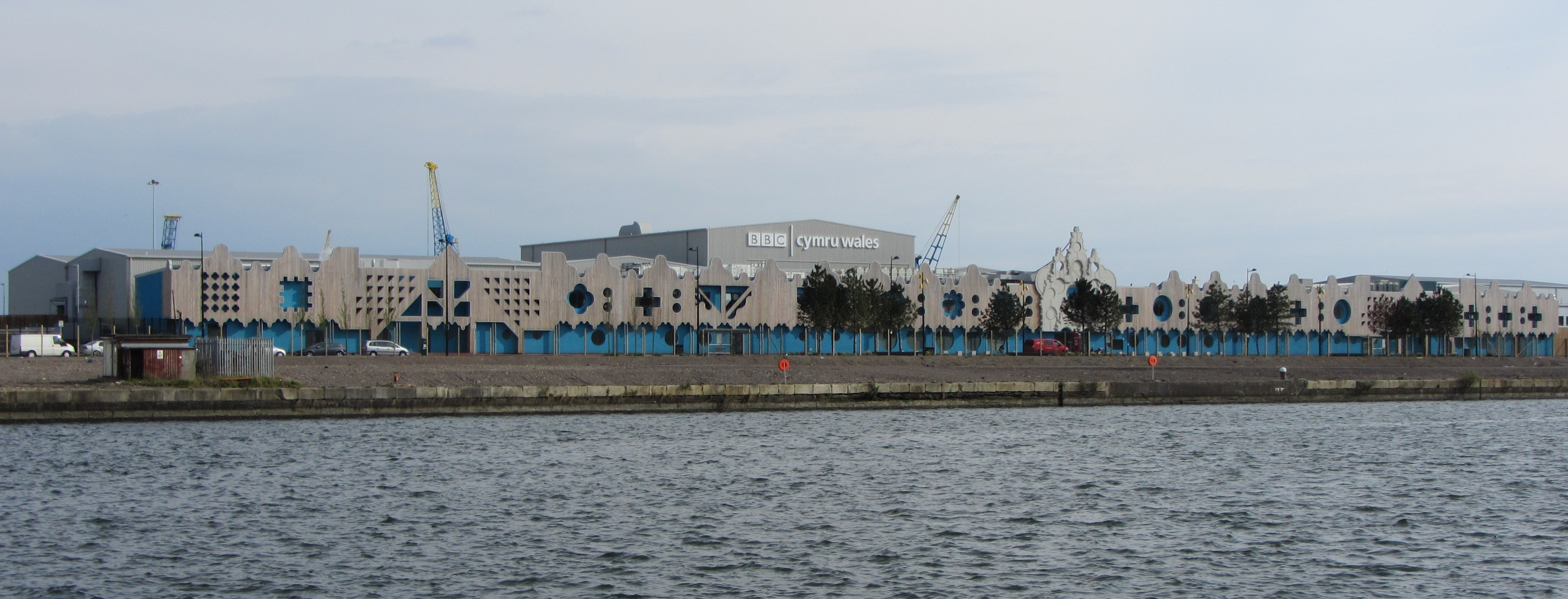
Series 38 is primarily filmed at Roath Lock Studios, located in Cardiff, where the serial has been produced since 2011.

The series commenced airing in the United Kingdom on 26 August 2023 on BBC One, a week after the conclusion to the previous series. Casualty normally airs weekly on BBC One on Saturday nights, although episodes 2 and 3 were broadcast as a double billing. Episode 30 was broadcast on BBC Two due to the coverage of the UEFA Euro 2024 on BBC One. It is produced by BBC Studios. Casualty operates its series by splitting them into mini-series of 12 episodes, focusing on a single main story arc in each mini-series. Series 38 features four mini-series; the first, Driving Force, continues from series 37. A History of Violence and Breaking Point were the second and third mini-series, followed by Storm Damage, which continued into the following series.

The number of episodes produced per year was reduced to thirty-six, with a regular transmission break implemented in the autumn months, due to cost inflation in the production of dramas. A publicity officer told Joe Anderton from Digital Spy that this was decided to preserve the quality of the show. The reduction in episodes meant that the show took a mid-series break after the broadcast of episode 6, at the conclusion of the Driving Force mini-series. The BBC's website promoted each mini-series as a separate series.

A promotional trailer for A History of Violence was released on 23 September 2023, with confirmation that the series would return to broadcast later in 2023. In December 2023, it was confirmed that the show would return to transmission on 30 December with a new mini-series. The mini-series, A History of Violence, was promoted in a trailer released on 7 December 2023. The following mini-series, Breaking Point, received a promotional trailer released on 20 March 2024. The final mini-series, Storm Damage, was previewed in a clip released to the show's Instagram account on 30 May 2024. An official promotional trailer was then released on 12 June 2024.

Jon Sen continues his role as executive producer until the end of the Breaking Point mini-series; his resignation was announced in October 2023. Kate Oates, the head of continuing drama at BBC Studios, expressed sadness at Sen's decision but accredited him with "creating some groundbreaking moments". Following Sen's departure, no executive producer is credited for the Storm Damage mini-series. Liza Mellody serves as series producer. Filming for Casualty primarily takes place in a purpose-built studio at the BBC Roath Lock Studios in Cardiff, although the nature of the show means that filming also takes place on-location. On-location filming often occurs in Cardiff and other areas of southern Wales.

== Cast ==
The thirty-eighth series of Casualty features a cast of characters working for the NHS within the emergency department of Holby City Hospital and the Holby Ambulance Service. Most cast members from the previous series reprise their roles in this series. William Beck appears as Dylan Keogh, a consultant in emergency medicine. Di Botcher portrays Jan Jenning, the operational duty manager at Holby Ambulance Service. Anna Chell plays staff nurse and midwife Jodie Whyte and Milo Clarke plays Theodore "Teddy" Gowan, a paramedic. Nigel Harman features as consultant Max Cristie, the department's clinical lead. Jaye Jacobs appears as Donna Jackson, the department's clinical nurse manager. Shalisha James-Davis plays Paige Allcott, an F1 doctor, and Elinor Lawless stars as consultant Stevie Nash. Kirsty Mitchell portrays Faith Cadogan, an advanced clinical practitioner (ACP), and Neet Mohan appears as Rash Masum, a clinical fellow. Eddie-Joe Robinson and Sarah Seggari play staff nurses Ryan Firth and Rida Amaan, respectively. Arin Smethurst and Michael Stevenson feature as paramedics Sah Brockner and Iain Dean, respectively. Original cast member Derek Thompson continues his role as Charlie Fairhead, a senior charge nurse and emergency nurse practitioner. Charles Venn portrays paramedic Jacob Masters, and Barney Walsh plays staff nurse Cameron Mickelthwaite. Additionally, two actors appear in a recurring capacity: Zoe Brough (relative Natalia Malinovsky), and Robert Pugh (relative Gethin West).

Jacobs departed the series in episode five at the conclusion of her character's story. Her departure had not been announced prior to transmission. The following episode features the exit of Pugh when his character Gethin kills himself. Thompson's departure was announced on 30 May 2023. He is the show's longest-serving cast member, having appeared in over 900 episodes over 37 years. The character departs at the conclusion of a "gripping" storyline suggested by Thompson which plays out across series 38. Sen praised Thompson for his creation of "an iconic character who is woven into the fabric of British TV history". He added that both Charlie and Thompson would be missed by the show. In a statement, Thompson thanked Pete Salt, the inspiration for his character, for his support in establishing the character of Charlie. Charlie's exit features in episode 18. Harman's departure from the show was officially confirmed by Sen in October 2023. Sen praised the actor, calling him "a brilliant addition to the show". He acknowledged that Harman was only contracted for a limited time, so explained that he wanted his stories to be "as explosive as possible". Three characters made unannounced departures during series 38. Robinson left his role as Eddie-Joe in episode 8; he was excited about his exit story. The following episode features Smethurst's departure as Sah. James-Davis made her departure from her role as Paige in episode 15. Glover made his departure from his role as Patrick in episode 30, his departure had not been announced prior to transmission.

The return of Zoe Hanna (Sunetra Sarker) was announced on 8 September 2023. The character returns as part of Charlie's departure, six years after her last appearance. Sarker expressed her excitement at reprising the role. Zoe returns in episode 17 and 18. On 6 March 2024, Ian Bleasdale was confirmed to be reprising his role as Josh Griffiths in episode 18 as part of Charlie's exit.

Melanie Hill joined the cast in series 38 as Siobhan McKenzie, the department's new clinical nurse manager. Siobhan is billed as a "hardworking", experienced and "no-nonsense" nurse who will use her knowledge to support the department in its time of crisis. Hill was excited to be playing Siobhan, who she dubbed "a supremely competent manager, who is firm but fair and expects nothing but the best from her nursing team". Sen expressed his joy at Hill's casting and called himself "a huge admirer of her work". Actress Adesuwa Oni was cast in the series as staff nurse Ngozi Okoye. The character and Oni's casting was announced in December 2023. Ngozi's backstory states that she has recently relocated from Nigeria.

On 7 February 2024, it was announced that three new characters would join the series. Jamie Glover was cast in the role of Patrick Onley, a trauma surgeon and the department's clinical lead. He was excited about joining the show and to work with "such a dedicated, skilful group of people". Manpreet Bachu and Sammy T. Dobson join the show as junior doctors Tariq Hussein and Nicole Piper, respectively. Tariq is also established as Rash's cousin. Both actors spoke of their delight to join the show, with Dobson commenting, "To become a piece of such a well-regarded part of BBC history is incredible". Tariq appears from episode 15, Patrick from episode 19, and Nicole from episode 20. Glover departed the show at the conclusion of the mini-series, in episode 30. The actor enjoyed his stint on the show and felt he and the production team managed to avoid Patrick becoming a "pantomime villain". Kellie Shirley joined the main cast from episode 31, as part of the Storm Damage miniseries; she portrays Sophia Peters, a psych liaison nurse.

The series features several recurring characters and multiple guest stars. Connor Curren continues his guest role as Ashley Morgan into the series, having first appeared in series 37. Kriss Dosanjh guest stars in the series as Ashok Masum, the father of Rash. The character is used to explore the topic of dementia. Dosanjh's guest stint concludes in episode 14 when the character is killed off. The casting of Kate Williams in the recurring role of Stella Lawson was announced on 26 August 2023. Stella is the mother of Max and grandmother of Jodie who is admitted to the ED as a patient. Williams described her as "very direct, very opinionated, and quite loud" and was excited to portray a "feisty senior" in the show. Angus Castle-Doughty's casting in the role of Kyle was announced on 6 March 2024. He appears in episode 17 as part of Charlie's departure from the show. Annette Badland guest stars in episode 18 as Shirley Baldwin, a charge nurse who appears in a flashback. Erin Zammitt of Digital Spy wrote that Badland would "play an important role" in the episode. Peter Salt, a medical advisor who was the basis for the character of Charlie, makes a cameo appearance as a nurse in episode 18.

Ryan Hawley joins the cast in the semi-regular role of Jamie Cleveland, a board member with a connection to Cam, in episode 30. In the same episode, Michael Keogh began appearing as firefighter Rich Walker, who stars in a story with Stevie. Tom Mulheron reprises his recurring role as Luka Malinovksy, who is Faith's son, in episode 31.

=== Main characters ===
- William Beck as Dylan Keogh
- Di Botcher as Jan Jenning
- Anna Chell as Jodie Whyte
- Milo Clarke as Teddy Gowan
- Nigel Harman as Max Cristie (until episode 16)
- Jaye Jacobs as Donna Jackson (until episode 5)
- Shalisha James-Davis as Paige Allcott (until episode 15)
- Elinor Lawless as Stevie Nash
- Kirsty Mitchell as Faith Cadogan
- Neet Mohan as Rash Masum
- Eddie-Joe Robinson as Ryan Firth (until episode 8)
- Sarah Seggari as Rida Amaan
- Arin Smethurst as Sah Brockner (until episode 9)
- Michael Stevenson as Iain Dean
- Derek Thompson as Charlie Fairhead (until episode 18)
- Charles Venn as Jacob Masters
- Barney Walsh as Cameron Mickelthwaite
- Adesuwa Oni as Ngozi Okoye (from episode 8)
- Manpreet Bachu as Tariq Hussein (from episode 15)
- Melanie Hill as Siobhan McKenzie (from episode 15)
- Jamie Glover as Patrick Onley (episodes 19−30)
- Sammy T. Dobson as Nicole Piper (from episode 20)
- Kellie Shirley as Sophia Peters (from episode 31)

=== Recurring characters ===
- Zoe Brough as Natalia Malinovsky
- Kriss Dosanjh as Ashok Masum
- Rod Hallett as Harry Sinclair
- Ryan Hawley as Jamie Cleveland
- Michael Keogh as Rich Walker
- Tom Mulheron as Luka Malinovsky
- Robert Pugh as Gethin West
- Kate Williams as Stella Lawson

=== Guest characters ===
- Annette Badland as Shirley Baldwin
- Ian Bleasdale as Josh Griffiths
- Angus Castle-Doughty as Kyle Marsh
- Connor Curren as Ashley Morgan
- Jeanie Hackman as Yasmin Zandi
- Ryan J Mackay as Bobby Morton
- Amanda Ryan as Mel Sinclair
- Sunetra Sarker as Zoe Hanna

== Episodes ==
No. overall	No. in series	Title	Directed by	Written by	Original release date	UK viewers (millions)
Driving Force
1300	1	"Aftermath"	Vicki Kisner	Rebekah Harrison	26 August 2023	2.60
The staff worry about reports of multiple stabbings at a march Jodie and Rida were attending. Donna has to deal with the fallout of her confession. Rash treats a family friend of Rida's. Teddy pricks Jan's conscience about Gethin.
1301	2	"The Ostrich Effect"	Vicki Kisner	Claire Miller	2 September 2023	2.79
Max's worsening health affects his treatment of a boy with asthma. Teddy and Jacob find a pregnant woman injured in a vigilante attack. Stevie and Faith's behaviour makes Natalia suspicious.
1302	3	"One Hundred Years"	Miguel Guerreiro	Toby Walton	2 September 2023	2.93
A storm and power cut see Stevie juggling Faith's addiction and a father and son with a secret, Dylan operating in a cubicle and Teddy delivering a baby in a lift. Max tries to stop his mother talking to Jodie.
1303	4	"Hard Pill"	Miguel Guerreiro	Rachel Harper	9 September 2023	2.53
Jan is aware Gethin is heading to Switzerland as she and Iain help a heart attack. Stevie, asked to get Faith to co-operate, meets a doctor whose husband won't listen. Donna takes her mind off things with a leukaemia sufferer and Max.
1304	5	"Too Much, Too Young"	Cóilín Ó Scolaí	Hilary Frankland	16 September 2023	3.14
Donna takes her mind off her sentencing helping the son of a dementia patient. Stevie manages Faith's addiction and a struggling young mum. An experience with a nanny who's had a stroke prompts Jodie to call Stella.
1305	6	"Switzerland"	Cóilín Ó Scolaí	Michelle Lipton	16 September 2023	2.89
Jan and Gethin spend his last two days in Switzerland before heading to a suicide clinic.
A History of Violence
1306	7	"Tinderbox"	Suri Krishnamma	Isla Gray	30 December 2023	N/A (<3.17) (Note: Not reported in the weekly top 50 programmes.)
An elderly woman is left waiting for hours in an ambulance with consequences for Ryan. Charlie and Stevie treat a father and son injured on a fishing trip. Faith helps a diabetic woman she found collapsed.
1307	8	"Aftershock"	Suri Krishnamma	Becky Prestwich	6 January 2024	N/A (<3.15)
New nurse Ngozi deals with the aftermath of a case of carbon monoxide poisoning. Teddy looks after a woman crushed under a car and hits a crossroads with Paige. An influx of casualties from a darts brawl sees Ryan make a decision.
1308	9	"Barriers"	Lance Kneeshaw	Rebekah Harrison	13 January 2024	3.09
Stevie instigates a new policy that sees aggressive patients barred. Sah is considering a surgery date when they and Jacob are caught up in a riot at an asylum seeker centre. Max tries to keep Stella and Jodie apart.
1309	10	"Red Flags"	Lance Kneeshaw	Ciara Conway	20 January 2024	3.11
The news Ray McKenna is loose disrupts Stevie's treatment of a man attacked at home. Rash's concerns with his father distract him from two youths from a car crash. Dylan and Jodie treat a young boy who swallowed something.
1310	11	"Liability"	Jamie Annett	Claire Miller	27 January 2024	2.89
Rash takes the lead on a labourer injured in a fall. Faith returns to work to deal with an obnoxious drunk and an elderly man who took the wrong medication. Stevie is suspicious about a woman who has several old untreated injuries.
1311	12	"Take the Strain"	Jamie Annett	Toby Walton	3 February 2024	3.08
Iain has a tough day with a suicide, a drug addict and Faith cutting ties. Rida and Rash's tension affects their dealing with an ectopic pregnancy. Teddy is torn between Paige and Jodie as he helps a drunk patient who may be more serious.
1312	13	"Willing and Able"	Paul Riordan	Toby Walton	10 February 2024	2.93
Max, fresh from dialysis, goes into some tunnels to help after a collapse. Stevie tries to hold together a volatile wedding party. Iain helps a woman give birth while hiding a secret about Natasha. Cam learns Ashok has injured Rida.
1313	14	"Last Words"	Paul Riordan	Poz Watson	17 February 2024	2.98
After walking out on a day with Ashok, Rash finds himself isolated with a suspected Ebola patient. Paige and Cam treat a boy attacked by a dog. Stevie finds herself in a distressed state after meeting a stabbing victim.
1314	15	"Haunted"	Paul Murphy	Isla Gray	24 February 2024	2.96
New clinical nurse manager Siobhan McKenzie has her hands full with a mental health patient. Tension rises between Paige and Jodie as they treat a casualty from a warehouse fire. Stevie is suspicious of Harry when Mel is brought back in.
1315	16	"Easy Way Out"	Paul Murphy	Kevin Rundle	2 March 2024	2.96
Iain and Jacob are called out to a farm whose owner hasn't been seen in weeks. Charlie helps a farmer with a gunshot wound. Rash and Faith discover a couple overworked paying for a wedding while Natalia's lost. Jodie learns Max is leaving.
1316	17	"Trauma"	Michael Lacey	Michelle Lipton	9 March 2024	3.13
Mel goes missing after Harry forces her off the road. Stevie tries to help a woman suffering from Covid anxiety. Iain and Teddy get caught up in a motorway pile-up which is made worse by a second incident. Zoe attends as a locum.
1317	18	"Charlie"	Michael Lacey	Michelle Lipton	16 March 2024	3.47
As Charlie is rushed into Resus after being stabbed, he remembers a day early in his career. Stevie is called out to the woods to treat Mel. Jan tries to comfort Teddy over recent events.
Breaking Point
1318	19	"System Failure"	Judith Dine	Rebekah Harrison	23 March 2024	N/A
Rash's return to work sees him dealing with a suicidal woman, a confused former rock star, his cousin Tariq being part of the staff and new clinical lead Patrick Onley.
1319	20	"Core Wounds"	Judith Dine	Rachel Harper	23 March 2024	2.63
New doctor Nicole finds an abandoned baby outside the hospital, Rash and Rida deal with the return of Fern and a cosmetic procedure gone wrong, and Jacob worries about an undiagnosed diabetic teenager.
1320	21	"Earn Your Stripes"	Conor Morrissey	Claire Miller	30 March 2024	2.84
Dylan is asked to mentor Rash but they have a difference of opinion over an accident patient's symptoms. Teddy encounters trouble while helping a rowdy hen party. Ngozi and Nicole bond while treating a fall patient.
1321	22	"Childhood's End"	Conor Morrissey	Ed Sellek	6 April 2024	2.87
Dylan and Nicole hit a problem while treating a woman who had a fall on the beach where she lost her son. Tariq helps a woman taken ill on the bus but clashes with Rash. Iain and Faith butt heads over a patient left in an ambulance.
1322	23	"Breathe with Me"	Matthew Evans	Poz Watson	13 April 2024	2.77
Teddy is plagued by flashbacks as he and Jan attend a pub fight. Rash and Rida help an evasive teenage skateboarder. Stevie and Nicole meet a recently separated middle-aged woman with behavioural changes.
1323	24	"Into the Fire"	Matthew Evans	Al Smith	20 April 2024	2.67
After meeting with Carter's mother, Jacob ends up running into a burning building on a shout. Rash has an unsettling encounter with his counsellor Uma while treating a hand injury. Stevie handles an ill veterinary student.
1324	25	"The Whistleblower"	Christopher McGill	Isla Gray	27 April 2024	2.66
A documentary criticising the department is on everyone's minds as Abe Burrows and his girlfriend end up there, Cam helps a man who was in a fight on the way to his dad's funeral and a girl who saw the documentary worries about her mother.
1325	26	"The Longest Shift"	Christopher McGill	Poz Watson	4 May 2024	2.65
Iain and Teddy end up under siege when rioters attack their ambulance. Under fire Patrick sabotages Stevie's treatment of an injured police officer. Jacob brings in Carter worried he's swallowed a key chain.
1326	27	"Shame the Devil"	David Kester	Lindsey Alford	18 May 2024	2.71
An attack on a mother and daughter leaves Rash and Rida feeling uncomfortable. Faith's history is outed by a friend brought in. A patient's mismatched friendship leads to Ngozi voicing an opinion on Nicole and Rosie's arrangement.
1327	28	"Siege Mentality"	David Kester	Hilary Frankland	25 May 2024	3.06
Teddy and Iain are under siege from a man with a crossbow at an isolated cottage. Faith is reinstated as ACP and tries to help a young boy. Nicole tries to counsel a couple trying for a baby as she and Rosie await test results.
1328	29	"Red-Handed"	Matt Hilton	Rachel Harper	1 June 2024	2.92
Dylan challenges Patrick as treating a car crash patient makes his limitations obvious. Jacob juggles Carter's care as he and Iain are called out to a housebound man. Rash and Tariq treat an allergic reaction.
1329	30	"The Last Post"	Matt Hilton	Hilary Frankland	8 June 2024	3.01
With Patrick on his way out, Rash confesses to being the whistle-blower and resigns, then Tariq finds he has attempted suicide. Rida helps an abused wife whose daughter is admitted and Dylan investigates the cause of a workplace injury.
Storm Damage
1330	31	"Sinking Ships – Day 1"	George C Siougas	Toby Walton	15 June 2024	N/A
Siobhan and Cam stumble across an injured baby during a storm. Stevie is called out to a HEMS shift at a car accident. Rash returns to work and helps out Tariq with an older construction worker.
1331	32	"Sinking Ships – Day 2"	George C Siougas	Toby Walton	22 June 2024	2.52
Iain accompanies Teddy on his first day back and ends up diving underwater to help a casualty in a sinking car. Stevie deals with an MND patient and his wife. Dylan enlists Sophia to help a mental health patient.
1332	33	"After the Flood"	Duncan Foster	Poz Watson	13 July 2024	2.47
The fallout of the storm causes Jan & Jacob to respond to a challenging job. Cam is forced to face demons from his past and Nicole has to manage a difficult dilemma.
1333	34	"Ghosts"	Duncan Foster	Erin Kubicki	20 July 2024	2.76
Jacob's concern for his son grows as he and Teddy find themselves trapped in a patients house. Dylan is in conflict with a former doctor and Cam fears an unwanted visitor.
1334	35	"Duped"	Sean Healy	Hilary Frankland	27 July 2024	N/A
Nicole's treatment of a woman makes her decide about her own pregnancy. Tariq attempts to help a diabetic with an alcohol problem and Stevie makes a staggering discovery about Rich.
1335	36	"Man's Best Friend"	Sean Healy	Isla Gray	3 August 2024	N/A
Siobhan digs deeper into Cam's problems. Dylan is distracted worrying about his dog Dervla and a stolen ambulance causes Teddy to be trapped with a patient.

== Reception ==
Casualty won the British Academy Television Award for Best Soap at the 2024 British Academy Television Awards. At the 29th National Television Awards in 2024, Casualty was nominated for Best Serial Drama, and Lawless, Mohan and Walsh were nominated for Best Serial Drama Performance.

Digital Spy's Erin Zammitt praised the Breaking Point mini-series, and the story arc format as a whole for the depths it allows themes to be explored. Zammitt described the series' focus on staff mental health as "important television", relating this to the struggles faced by real NHS workers. She complimented the focus on Rash and Neet Mohan's performance, as well as the story's efforts to follow Rash's journey beyond his breakdown and the series' awareness of systemic failures. Zammitt also noted the impact of the series showing Dylan's struggles, due to audiences having known him as "confident and focused" for more than ten years on-screen.
