= Olly Rix =

English actor (born 1985)

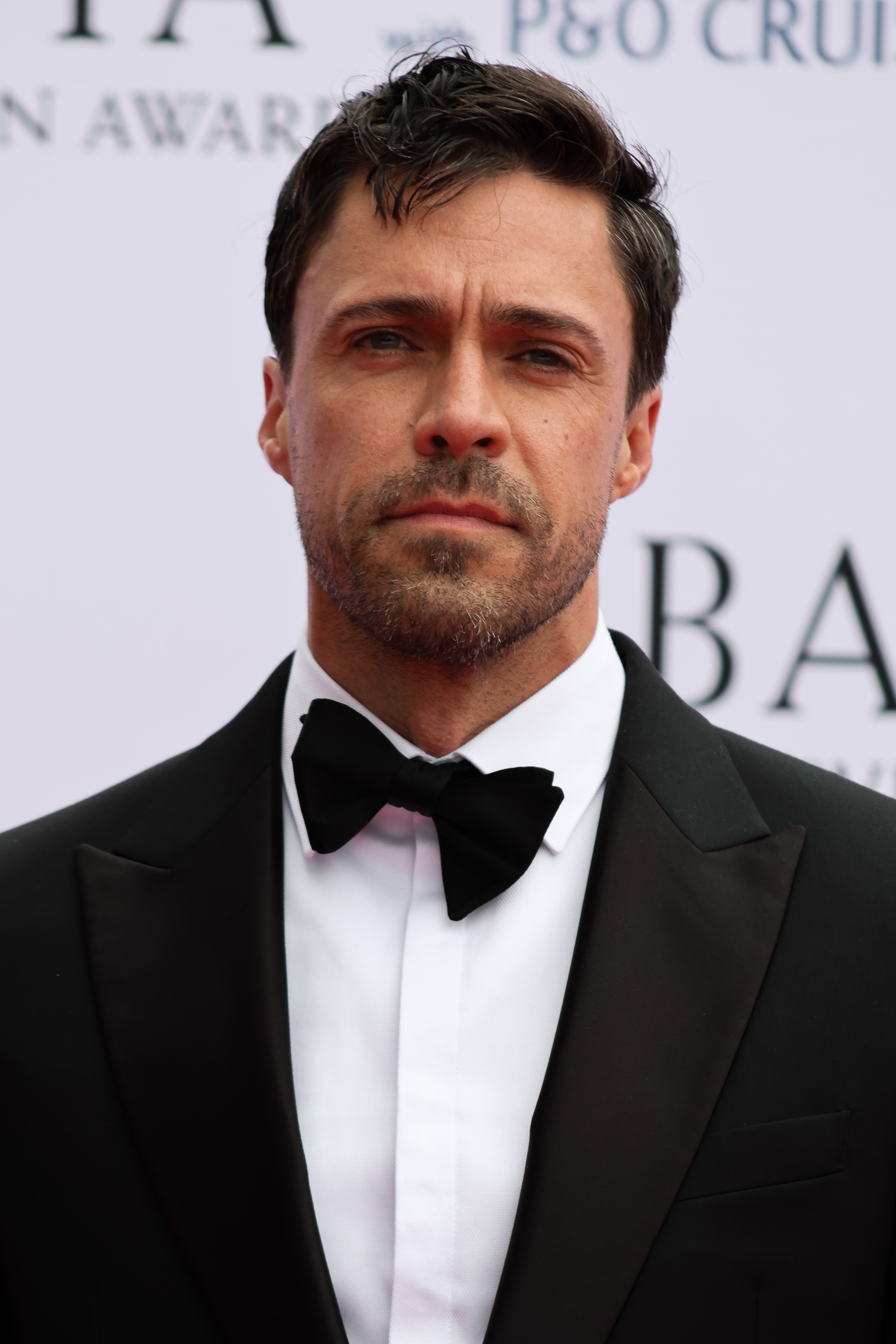
- Rix at the 2026 British Academy Television Awards
- Born: 14 February 1985 (age 41)
- Education: Oxford University; London Academy of Music and Dramatic Art
- Occupation: Actor
- Years active: 2010–present
- Television: WPC 56; Of Kings and Prophets; The Spanish Princess; Call the Midwife; Casualty
- Partner(s): Anna Chell (2025–present; engaged)

Olly Rix (born 14 February 1985) is a British actor. His initial roles were in theatre productions, notably with the Royal Shakespeare Company. His stage debut saw him portray the titular role in Cardenio, going on to appear in various other productions including Marat/Sade, The City Madam and Richard II. Rix has also starred in various television series including Death Comes to Pemberley, WPC 56, Of Kings and Prophets, The Spanish Princess and Call the Midwife, as well as joining the cast of Casualty in 2025.

== Life and career ==
=== 1985–2013: Early life and stage work ===
Rix was born in 1985 on Valentine's Day, 14 February. The schools he attended as a child did not offer drama opportunities to his annoyance, so Rix did not start performing on stage until university. He felt like his fellow students had been acting since young children so tried to get as involved as possible. He studied at Oxford University, eventually going on to train in acting at the London Academy of Music and Dramatic Art. Whilst at the latter, one of his close friends was Sam Claflin. His first stage performance was as Oedipus inside the cathedral at Christ Church, Oxford. He has since joked that he was "almost certainly god-awful" and said that he was terrified, but added that he had a lot of fun. Rix appeared as a student union patron in the second series of the BBC police drama Ashes to Ashes. The episode was broadcast on May 4, 2009. Rix attained his first professional credit in the 2010 short film The Duel at Blood Creek.

Rix made his stage debut in 2011 when he starred as the titular role in Cardenio. He initially believed he was auditioning for a minor role and has admitted he was unaware what Cardenio was, but was shocked to learn he was being considered for the lead role. He felt lucky to have landed a titular role as his first stage role, initially believing he would have to wait years to be considered for such. He then starred in a production of Marat/Sade with the Royal Shakespeare Company (RSC) later that year, as well as The City Madam at the Swan Theatre. In 2012, Rix starred in a production of I Am a Camera as Clive at Southwark Playhouse. A year later, he appeared at the Royal Court Theatre in their production of Narrative. Also in 2013, he returned to the RSC for their production of Richard II. He portrayed the Duke of Aumerle. WhatsOnStage wrote that his portrayal "tugs at the heartstrings".

=== 2013–present: Breakthrough with television work ===
In 2013, after his final stage appearance in Richard II, Rix made his television debut. He portrayed the role of Cartwright in the BBC miniseries Death Comes to Pemberley. A year later, he appeared in an episode of ITV's Midsomer Murders. In 2015, he recurred in the BBC period drama series The Musketeers. That same year, he starred in the third series of WPC 56, also on BBC. In 2016, Rix made his international breakthrough when he starred in ABC's drama series Of Kings and Prophets as David. At the time, Rix was considered an unknown stage actor and was shocked to be flown out to Los Angeles four times for screen tests. He was exhausted with the process, believing he stood no chance of securing the role. He lived in South Africa for a year whilst filming the series, which he described as one of the best times of his life. However, ABC pulled Of Kings and Prophets after two episodes, citing low ratings as the reason. Rix said he "went from being on top of the world to back in my parents' spare room working out what the hell happened".

In 2017, Rix was cast in a main role in the television film The Machine. A year later, he starred in the third series of the BBC military drama series Our Girl. He portrayed Captain Bones McClyde. In 2019, he appeared in an episode of the Acorn TV series Agatha Raisin, as well as joining the cast of The Spanish Princess. In the latter, he portrayed Edward Stafford until 2020. Then, in 2021, he joined the cast of the BBC's period drama Call the Midwife. He portrayed series regular Matthew Aylward over four of the series, after which his character was written out. Following his exit, he was pictured near the set of fellow BBC drama series Casualty in July 2024, and it was rumoured that he was to join the series. The reports were confirmed by the BBC in February 2025, with them announcing that Rix would portray Flynn Byron in the thirty-ninth series.

== Filmography ==
Year	Title	Role	Notes
2009	Ashes to Ashes	Student Union Patron	Series 2 Episode 3
2010	The Duel at Blood Creek	Lt. Beckett	Short film
2013	Death Comes to Pemberley	Cartwright	Recurring role
2014	Midsomer Murders	Alex Darnley	Episode: "The Flying Club"
2015	The Musketeers	Navas	Recurring role
2015	WPC 56	DI Harry Sawyer	Main role
2016	Of Kings and Prophets	David	Main role
2017	The Machine	James	Television film
2018	Our Girl	Bones McClyde	Main role
2019	Agatha Raisin	Tristan Delon	Episode: "The Curious Curate"
2019–2020	The Spanish Princess	Edward Stafford	Main role
2021–2024	Call the Midwife	Matthew Aylward	Main role
2025–present	Casualty	Flynn Byron	Main role

== Stage ==
Year	Title	Role	Venue	Ref.
2011	Cardenio	Cardenio	The Swan	
2011	Marat/Sade		Royal Shakespeare Theatre	
2011	The City Madam	Ramble	The Swan	
2012	I Am a Camera	Clive	Southwark Playhouse	
2013	Narrative		Royal Court Theatre	
2013	Richard II	Duke of Aumerle	Royal Shakespeare Theatre	
