= Eddie-Joe Robinson =

English actor (born 1994)

- Born: Fast Eddie Joe Robinson; 19 September 1994 (age 30); Sheffield, South Yorkshire, England
- Education: University College London; National Youth Theatre
- Occupation: Actor
- Years active: 2013–present
- Television: Casualty

Fast Eddie Joe Robinson (born 19 September 1994), known professionally as Eddie-Joe Robinson, is an English actor. He began his career appearing in various stage productions after training at the National Youth Theatre, with starring roles in Jekyll and Hyde, Save + Quit, Coriolanus and Sorry, You're Not a Winner, amongst other productions. He has also made various appearances in television series, having played Jono Laverne on the ITV1 soap opera Emmerdale in 2019 and Ryan Firth on the BBC medical drama series Casualty between 2023 and 2024.

== Life and career ==
Fast Eddie Joe Robinson was born in Sheffield, South Yorkshire on 19 September 1994. He studied mathematics at University College London and became a maths tutor. Robinson also trained in acting at the National Youth Theatre (NYT). Whilst at NYT, he appeared in stage productions including If Kevin Can, Othello and Mrs Dalloway. He then made his professional stage debut in Save + Quit at the Assembly George Square Studios.

Robinson made his television debut in an episode of the BBC medical soap opera as a younger version of regular character Rob Hollins in flashback scenes. He then made his film debut in 2017, in How to Talk to Girls at Parties. After appearing in an episode of the crime drama series Ransom, Robinson appeared in a 2019 episode of the BBC medical drama Casualty as a patient. Later in 2019, he played the recurring role of Jono Laverne on the ITV1 soap opera Emmerdale in 2019. He was introduced as the friend of established character Matty Barton (Ash Palmisciano).

In 2020, Robinson returned to the stage to appear in a production of Coriolanus at Sheffield's Crucible Theatre. Then in 2022, he starred in Paines Plough's touring production of Sorry, You're Not a Winner. He also continued to make various television appearances, including roles in Small Axe, The One and Grantchester, until he returned to Casualty full-time in 2023. He was cast as nurse Ryan Firth and made his first appearance as the character on 8 April 2023. Robinson's casting was part of a shakeup on the series and was announced alongside three other new castings: Anna Chell, Sarah Seggari and Barney Walsh. Robinson made an unannounced departure from the series in January 2024.

== Filmography ==
Year	Title	Role	Notes	Ref.
2015	Doctors	Young Rob Hollins	Episode: "The Prince"	
2017	How to Talk to Girls at Parties	Jonesy	Film role	
2018	Ransom	James Smith	Episode: "The Fawn"	
2019	Casualty	Ben Leighton	Guest role	
2019	Emmerdale	Jono Laverne	Recurring role	
2020	Small Axe	PC Millar	Episode: "Red, White and Blue"	
2021	400 Bullets	Beasley	Film role	
2021	The One	Jack	Guest role	
2021	Grantchester	Davy Connor	Guest role	
2023–2024	Casualty	Ryan Firth	Main role	

== Stage ==
Year	Title	Role	Venue	Ref.
Unknown	Skunk	Otto	National Youth Theatre	
Unknown	If Kevin Can	Kevin	National Youth Theatre	
Unknown	Othello	Cassio	Frantic Assembly	
2017	Mrs Dalloway	Septimus	National Youth Theatre	
2017	Jekyll and Hyde	Officer Rose/Dr Finn	Ambassadors Theatre	
2018	Save + Quit	Joe	Assembly George Square Studios	
2020	Coriolanus	Cotus	Crucible Theatre	
2022	Sorry, You're Not a Winner	Liam	UK tour	
2024	Chariots of Fire	Scholz/Cast	Crucible Theatre	
