= Anna Chell =

English actress (born 1997)

- Born: Anna Lucy Chell; 17 January 1997 (age 29); Stafford, England
- Education: Oxford School of Drama; The Manchester College; Academy of Live and Recorded Arts
- Occupation: Actress
- Years active: 2013–present
- Television: Casualty
- Height: 5 ft 5 in (1.65 m)
- Partner(s): Olly Rix (2025-present; engaged)

Anna Lucy Chell (born 17 January 1997) is an English actress. She began her career appearing in various stage productions including A Midsummer Night's Dream, The Crucible and Great Expectations, before being cast as Jodie Whyte in the BBC medical drama series Casualty in 2023.

== Life and career ==
Anna Lucy Chell was born on 17 January 1997 in Stafford. Prior to pursuing acting, she worked in hospitality. Whilst there, she performed in a production of A Midsummer Night's Dream at the Stafford Shakespeare Festival. She moved to Manchester in 2013 and studied at the Manchester College, before obtaining a BA in acting at the Academy of Live and Recorded Arts. She also studied at the Oxford School of Drama and was shortlisted for the BBC Carleton Hobbs Bursary Award. Whilst studying, she starred in various stage productions, including The Wonderful World of Dissocia, Great Expectations and Love and Information, amongst others.

In 2021, Chell portrayed the recurring role of Kerry Lockwood in the ITV crime drama series The Bay. A year later, she appeared in a national advertisement campaign for food brand Doritos, as well as appearing in a rehearsed reading of Les the Punter in Manchester. Then in 2023, Chell was cast as nurse and midwife Jodie Whyte on the BBC medical drama series Casualty. She made her first appearance as the character on 8 April 2023. Chell's casting was part of a shakeup on the series and was announced alongside three other new castings: Eddie-Joe Robinson, Sarah Seggari and Barney Walsh. During her first few months on the series, her character was involved in various dramatic storylines including grieving her dead mother, finding out her estranged father is her boss, being spiked and kidnapped, being attacked by a patient, handling a venomous snake on the ward, being at the centre of a bomb attack and witnessing misogynistic terrorism at a women's march.

== Filmography ==
Year	Title	Role	Notes	Ref.
2021	The Bay	Kerry Lockwood	Recurring role	
2023–present	Casualty	Jodie Whyte	Main role	

== Stage ==
Year	Title	Role	Ref.
2013	A Midsummer Night's Dream	Fairy	
2014	1984	Julia	
2015	The Crucible	Abigail Williams	
2017	The Wonderful World of Dissocia	Lisa	
2018	The Pink Bedroom	Helen	
2018	Beginning	Laura	
2019	Great Expectations	Biddy/Startop	
2020	Earthquakes in London	Jasmine	
2020	Love and Information	Various	

== Awards and nominations ==
Year	Award	Nominated work	Result	Ref.
Unknown	BBC Carleton Hobbs Bursary Award	Herself	Shortlisted	
