= Rash Masum =

Fictional character from the BBC medical drama Casualty

- Casualty character
- Neet Mohan as Rash Masum
- First appearance: Episode 1060; 4 November 2017
- Portrayed by: Neet Mohan
- Duration: 2017–

In-universe information
- Occupation: Consultant in emergency medicine
- Family: Madia Masum (mother); Ashok Masum (father); Tariq Hussein (cousin)

Rashid "Rash" Masum is a fictional character from the BBC medical drama Casualty, played by actor Neet Mohan. He first appeared in the eleventh episode of series thirty-two, which was broadcast on 4 November 2017. Rash is introduced into the series as a junior doctor undergoing his first year of the Foundation Programme. Rash is characterised as a shy and bashful doctor; he is an eternal optimist who tries to make others laugh. Casualty's series producer Lucy Raffety billed Rash as an "innocent, cautious and nice" character. Mohan took a temporary break from the show in 2019 and upon his return writers introduced a more assertive version of the character, with his "innocence jaded".

Writers created a relationship story for Rash and hospital porter Gemma Dean (Rebecca Ryan). Their romance is made difficult due to Rash's shy persona. Producers decided to focus an entire series of Casualty highlighting the pressure the NHS workforce endure. Rash's role in the saga explored hospital hierarchy and how junior doctors are burdened with pressure. The story incorpoarated a feud with his mentor and consultant Ethan Hardy (George Rainsford). Rash also spars with F1 Mason Reede (Victor Oshin), but his subsequent death at work has a negative effect on Rash, who then becomes the centre of a depression storyline where his deteriorating mental health results in a suicide attempt. Other stories include Mohan participating in a car stunt and dealing with grief following the death of his mother, Madia (Buckso Dhillon-Woolley), his father Ashok (Kriss Dosanjh) being diagnosed with dementia, and conflict with his cousin Tariq (Manpreet Bachu). For his portrayal of Rash, Mohan was nominated for a "Best Newcomer" award at the 2019 National Television Awards.

== Casting ==
Mohan successfully auditioned for the role of Rash but had recently relocated to London with his partner. Mohan still accepted the role, opting to commute to Cardiff where Casualty is filmed. Mohan's casting was first publicised by Elaine Reilly of What's on TV and the character was previewed in the show's Autumn 2017 trailer. Mohan made his first on-screen appearance as Rash in episode 11 of series 32, which was broadcast on 4 November 2017.

== Development ==
=== Characterisation and introduction ===
Rash, short for Rashid, is a cheeky chappie and an eternal optimist who always tries to make the rest of the ED laugh. The only problem is sometimes they laugh with him and other times at him. Rash’s charming bedside manner always ensures he has a good relationship with his patients. However, his cheerful outlook can also be a mask for anxiety, as he’s not always the most confident in his own ability. He has a nervous disposition and often shows this by puking his guts up in the hospital toilets.

— An excerpt from Rash's profile on the official Casualty website.

Rash is characterised as an "eternal optimist" and "cheeky" doctor who tries to bring laughter to the emergency ward. He is portrayed as possessing a "charming bedside manner" which builds a good rapport with patients. Sometimes Rash lacks confidence in his own ability and his "cheerful outlook" masks his work place anxiety. In scenes Rash has been shown to have "a nervous disposition" but always present is his motivation to succeed in the medical business. Rash is from a working-class background, and his family of "high flyers" value education greatly. Rash is an intellectual and is not "street smart". When he is introduced into the series, Rash is living at home and looked after by his mother, making him appear as a "mummy's boy". One reason Rash chooses to work at Holby City hospital is to reinvent himself and lose his "boyish charm". Casualty's series producer Lucy Raffety revealed that Rash would be an "innocent, cautious and nice" character.

When he is first introduced, Rash has a "preppy look and glasses" which were reminiscent of the style portrayed by established character Ethan Hardy (George Rainsford). What's on TV's Reilly opined that Rash had "the look of a young Ethan Hardy" and Rainsford told the journalist that "a couple of people have mentioned that Rash looks potentially like an Ethan-in-the-making in a bookish, bespectacled way."

Upon his arrival, Rash is allocated a mentor, Lily Chao (Crystal Yu). Rash is a junior doctor undergoing his first year of the Foundation Programme. Producer Raffety told Sophie Dainty from Digital Spy that Rash would find a friend in nurse David Hide (Jason Durr), who "takes him under his wing which is lovely". Mohan liked working with Durr, who he believed had really "took him under his wing" just like the story with their characters. Rash fails to make a positive impression with his colleagues because of his unwillingness to work in resus. When he has to take part in a gory case, Rash vomits in the toilets. He then tries to overcome his fears and treat more patients.

=== Relationship with Gemma Dean ===
Producers created Rash's first relationship story with hospital porter Gemma Dean (Rebecca Ryan). The story begins when Rash is determined to prove himself is the resus ward, after doctor Alicia Munroe (Chelsea Halfpenny) asks him to treat a dangerous patient, Jack MacLellan (Sam Hudson). Rash tries to be confident and control the situation but Jack escapes and takes Gem hostage. Mohan told What's on TV's Reilly that "Rash has his confidence challenged by prisoner Jack." When Jack takes Gem hostage, Mohan believed Rash's entire demeanour changed and he "kicks into fight or flight mode". Jack drags Gem out of the hospital, bundles her into a stolen car and tries to flee. In order to save Gem, he added that Rash "dives on the bonnet of the car". The story was the first stunt Mohan filmed in Casualty. To make it seem authentic, Mohan was tied down to the bonnet of the car. When the driver put the vehicle in motion the actor was swung to either side of the bonnet. In the following episode, Gem arrives at the work with a new hair style. Rash realises he is attracted to Gem and likes her more after saving her from danger.

Rash's feelings for Gem continue to grow and writers used his shy and bashful characterisation to make awkward scenarios. Mohan told Sarah Ellis of Inside Soap that "Rash is out of his depth when he's talking to women anyway, but when he's got a crush on someone, it just spirals out of control!" Rash wants to tell Gem how he feels but opts to remain quiet on a number of occasions. When he witnesses Gem talking to another man, he decides to ask her out for lunch. She accepts but clinical lead Connie Beauchamp (Amanda Mealing) orders Rash to carry out medical research. Rash leaves Gem waiting and he cancels their date. When Gem discovers that he was working she is not impressed. Mohan explained that the pair's romance would be a "slow burn" which would "be worth it in the end". In another scenario, Rash and Gem have a date which is ruined by Rash vomiting. After this Rash considers taking Jamila Vani (Sujaya Dasgupta) to a ball, but their colleagues sabotage his plans. Rash explains to Gem that he nervously threw up because he had never had sex before and they reconcile. Rash and Gem are portrayed with quite contrasting personalities. Mohan believed that the pair were compatible despite being "such opposites". They have opposite personalities and different upbringings but Rash finds this "intriguing". He added that Rash "really fancies" Gem and that is why Rash struggles to impress her.

When Gem's brother, Iain Dean (Michael Stevenson), attempts to kill himself, Rash tries to support her through the ordeal. Gem behaves out of character and does not appreciate Rash's efforts to help. Ryan told Inside Soap's Alice Penwill that "it's hard for Rash, as he wants to be there for Gem, although she's very stubborn." The actress explained that Gem wants Rash to look after her but she "pulls away". He can only offer words of sympathy and that "irritates" her. Regardless of their problems, Ryan thought that Rash and Gem had a good future together. She added that they "have had a lot of ups and downs, but Gem's very content and she's happy with him".

=== Temporary departure and return ===
In 2019, Mohan took a break from Casualty. In his exit story, which was broadcast in April 2019, Rash and Gem had agreed to go travelling. They postpone their plans after Gemma's brother Iain attempts to kill himself. They later decide to resume their plans and he books tickets to travel to Vietnam. Rash's mother, Madia Masum (Buckso Dhillon-Woolley), discovers the tickets and suffers an angina attack. When she is admitted to the ED, she tells Rash that she found the tickets. Rash tells Madia that he wants to travel prior to resuming the second phase of his medical career. Gem convinces Rash to leave without her and to stop relying on his mother so much. The story ended with Rash leaving alone to go travelling. Mohan's departure was not publicised prior to the broadcast and this lead viewers to believe the character had left permanently. Sophie Dainty from Digital Spy reported that Mohan had taken a break from the series. She added that he was already back filming with the show.

A publicist for the drama series announced Rash would return in August 2019. Details about his return were under a press embargo. Dainty stated that Rash and Gem's relationship was in doubt. Gem begins to miss Rash and decides to quit her job and join him travelling. After the episode aired, it was confirmed that Ryan had left the series and the scenes were her departure story. This signalled the end Rash and Gem's relationship with Rash's imminent return. Mohan believed that Rash and Gem's relationship ending off-screen felt "unresolved". The character returns in the opening episode of the following series. It is revealed that Madia had died and he returns for her funeral. When Rash hears of an emergency he decides to return to work and leaves his father, Ashok Masum (Kriss Dosanjh), to grieve alone.

After he returns the clinical lead Dylan Keogh (William Beck) offers Rash a full time position in the ED. Rash returns to work intent on "finding his position within the hospital" and "finding his assertiveness". Madia's death had a negative effect on Rash's well-being and this soon becomes apparent in scenes. Mohan explained that it is "absolutely heart-breaking" for Rash and he finds it hard to support his father through their grief. Mohan later assessed that Rash had evolved from the "fresh and green" character that first appeared in Casualty. Rash's "innocence is slightly jaded now" and because he had endured "so many difficult and heart-breaking things".

=== Hospital hierarchy ===
Writers decided to focus an entire series portraying the NHS under pressure. Rash featured heavily in a story which explored the dynamics of hospital hierarchy. It shows the effects of a clinical lead off-loading work onto consultants, such as Ethan. In turn, Ethan passes his duties onto junior doctors, including Rash and Mason Reede (Victor Oshin). Ethan is supposed to be their mentor offering support but he is preoccupied and suffering from Posttraumatic stress disorder (PTSD). Rainsford branded it a "big storyline" focusing the "true reflection" of NHS staff "struggling under the weight of their responsibilities". Rash and Mason are often put to work together on the ward, but Mason refuses to cooperate with Rash and they are often depicted at odd with each other. Oshin told Ellis (Inside Soap) that Mason received a negative reaction from Casualty viewers because Rash is well liked. He believed his character needed to "relax", "listen" and realise that being on a team of medics is a "collaborative effort".

Dylan continues to struggle in his role and Ethan prepares for a hospital inspection and passes his work onto Rash. At this point Rash is already overworked; Mohan told Reilly (What's on TV) that Rash is "willing to take on all this extra pressure". He thought that the "chain of command" was prevalent and "all going downwards". Rash keeps accepting more work to complete his fellowship and tries "his absolute best". When two patients are admitted to the ED, Rash prioritises the care of the more visibly wounded. The other patient suddenly becomes critically ill and Rash gets the blame. The actor explained that Ethan accuses Rash of negligence and launches a verbal attack about his family problems. When Ethan mentions Rash's grief over his mother's death, he punches Ethan in the face. Mohan justified Rash hitting his superior, adding that "Rash is being made a scapegoat. He's dealing with so many difficult things, and it's really hard for him." Rash and Ethan both struggling with work and personal issues creates "the perfect storm". Rainsford found the story difficult to film because he knew Ethan was "being hypocritical" and "acting out of character" towards Rash. He added that he tried not to judge the characters and made sense of the story's context.

Producers incorporated the surprise death of Mason into Rash's story. The scenes were not publicised prior to broadcast and featured Rash finding Mason dead in a storeroom. The scenes highlighted how the pressurised working environment left Rash not knowing much about his colleague. Rash finds Mason's death difficult but tries to continue working. He also comes to the realisation that, like himself, Mason was just trying to do the best job possible. Ethan buckles under the pressure and decides to take a leave of absence following Mason's death. His decision further damages his working relationship with Rash. Rainsford explained that Ethan's departure was poorly timed and he thought that Ethan should have stayed to help his colleagues and resolve his issues with Rash. Writers continued to explore the idea that "everybody in the NHS is under pressure". When Ethan returns he tries to support Rash, but he rebuffs Ethan's gestures. Their working relationship becomes volatile and Rash behaves out of character. Rash ignores Ethan and in one scene argues with him in front of patients. Rainsford believed that Rash and Ethan were quite similar characters and therefore clash. He acknowledged that there was a "lot of bad blood between them" and only "some self-reflection and also some honesty" could resolve their differences. Writers later gave reconciled the pair after they are forced to treat a patient together. Ethan acknowledges that he should have better supported Rash through the ordeal.

The show's 40th annversary saw Masum's first shift as a Consultant, where a major exploion destroys St James'.

== Reception ==
For his portrayal of Rash, Mohan was nominated in the "Newcomer" category at the 2019 National Television Awards. Mohan was later longlisted for "Best Drama Star" at the 2024 Inside Soap Awards for his portrayal of the character.

Digital Spy's Dainty opined that viewers were "sad" to see Rash leave and say a "bittersweet" good-bye to Gem. Jenni McKnight from What's on TV stated that fans were "distraught" and "left in shock" over Rash's departure. Joe Julians from Radio Times wrote that Rash is "quite the charmer, something that comes in handy at work when it comes to having a good bedside manner". Sarah Ellis (Inside Soap) branded Rash a "shy" and "jumpy F1", adding that he is a "hot doctor". What's on TV's Reilly said that Rash made a "bad impression" on his colleagues for throwing up at work. She believed Rash was an unlikely hero for saving Gem's life, adding "think of a hero and Casualty's Rash Masum doesn't exactly spring to mind." Rash and Gem's slow developed romance frustrated Sue Haasler from Metro. She said that she wanted to "shove them into a store room and make them actually talk to each other".
