= Milo Clarke =

English actor (born 1997)

- Born: Milo Coltrane Clarke; 31 March 1997 (age 29); Manchester, England
- Education: ALRA (BA)
- Occupation: Actor
- Years active: 2017–present
- Television: Casualty

Milo Coltrane Clarke (born 31 March 1997) is an English actor. Following stage roles including 27 Wagons Full of Cotton, 24 Italian Songs and Arias, The Alchemist and The Play That Goes Wrong, Clarke was cast in the BBC medical drama series Casualty as Theodore "Teddy" Gowan in 2021.

== Life and career ==
Clarke was born on 31 March 1997 in Manchester. He did a foundation course in acting at ALRA South on Wandsworth Common, before going onto obtain a BA in acting from ALRA North in Wigan. Whilst attending ALRA, Clarke appeared in various theatre productions. He made his stage debut in 2017, portraying Silva Vicarro in 27 Wagons Full of Cotton. A year later, he appeared in Theatre503's production of Copper and Steel as Flint, as well as Beep at the Afterthought Theatre. In 2019, the year he graduated from ALRA, Clarke starred in 24 Italian Songs and Arias at the Yard Theatre. He also portrayed Subtle in The Alchemist at the Globe Theatre.

2019 also marked Clarke's West End theatre debut when he portrayed Max in the Mischief Theatre's production of The Play That Goes Wrong. He appeared in the production until 2021. That same year, Clarke was cast in the BBC medical drama Casualty. He was introduced as a paramedic and the nephew of established character Jan Jenning (Di Botcher), with his first appearance airing on 14 August 2021. After he was at the centre of a storyline that sees Teddy sexually assaulted, Clarke was nominated for Best Drama Star at the 2024 Inside Soap Awards.

== Filmography ==
| Year | Title | Role | Notes |
|---|---|---|---|
| 2018 | Face | Subject | Episode: "Milo" |
| 2021–present | Casualty | Theodore "Teddy" Gowan | Main role |
| 2024 | How to Navigate Being a Monster | Martin | Short film |

== Stage ==
| Year | Title | Role | Venue |
|---|---|---|---|
| 2017 | 27 Wagons Full of Cotton | Silva Vicarro | ALRA |
| 2018 | Copper and Steel | Flint | Theatre503 |
| 2018 | Beep | Jake | Afterthought Theatre |
| 2018 | Alice in Wonderland | Gryphon | ALRA |
| 2018 | Through the Looking-Glass | White Night | ALRA |
| 2019 | 24 Italian Songs and Arias | Myself | The Yard Theatre |
| 2019 | Posh | Toby | ALRA |
| 2019 | The Alchemist | Subtle | Globe Theatre |
| 2019 | Days of Significance | Brookes | ALRA |
| 2019 | The Play That Goes Wrong | Max | Mischief Theatre |

== Awards and nominations ==
| Year | Ceremony | Category | Nominated work | Result | Ref. |
|---|---|---|---|---|---|
| 2024 | Inside Soap Awards | Best Drama Star | Casualty | Nominated | |
