= Elinor Lawless =

Northern Irish actress

- Born: 23 April 1982 (age 44); Draperstown, Northern Ireland
- Education: Bristol Old Vic Theatre School
- Occupation: Actress
- Years active: 2000–present
- Television: Casualty
- Children: 1

Elinor Lawless (born 23 April 1982) is a British actress from Draperstown, Northern Ireland, known for portraying the role of Stevie Nash in the BBC medical drama series Casualty. Prior to her role in Casualty, Lawless appeared in various stage productions and BBC television series, including EastEnders and Doctors.

== Early and personal life ==
Lawless was born in Draperstown. At the age of three, she was diagnosed with two cardiac conditions; a hole in her heart and anomalous pulmonary venous connection, where blood runs in the wrong direction. She spent a lot of time in hospitals as a child, and at seven, she had open-heart surgery in the Royal Belfast Hospital for Sick Children. She had regular check-up appointments until the age of 21, when she was deemed healthy. While attending St Mary's Grammar School in Magherafelt, she finished as runner-up in PricewaterhouseCoopers' award ceremony in the Leaders of Tomorrow category. She then trained in acting at the Bristol Old Vic Theatre School and won the Peter Akerman Award for Best Comedy Actress.

Lawless was married to fellow actor Peter Basham. Lawless and Basham had a son in 2016. He was born premature, and due to weighing under 2.2 kilograms, he spent days in a specialist baby unit. On the experience, Lawless felt that she could now relate to her parents due to their stress over her condition as a child. Lawless also commended the National Health Service for their treatment of herself and her child.

== Career ==
Lawless made her professional screen debut in Poisoned (2013), a short film. In 2015, alongside husband Basham, she starred in a production of Hansel and Gretel held at the Stephen Joseph Theatre. Then from 2018 to 2019, she appeared in various BBC television series. These roles included an episode of Shakespeare & Hathaway: Private Investigators, a recurring role as Laura in EastEnders, and episodes of Casualty and Doctors. In 2021, she returned to Doctors for one episode as Liv Keane, before being cast as Stevie Nash in Casualty. Lawless felt "honoured" to be cast as a doctor on the series due to her appreciation for the NHS throughout her life. For her portrayal of Stevie, she was nominated for Best Daytime Star at the 2022 Inside Soap Awards.

== Filmography ==
Film and television roles
Year	Title	Role	Notes
2013	Poisoned	Kate	Short film
2018	Shakespeare & Hathaway: Private Investigators	Antigone Carter	Episode: "Outrageous Fortune"
2019	EastEnders	Laura	Recurring role
2019	Casualty	Hollie Summer	1 episode
2019	Doctors	Yasmin Mitchell	Episode: "I Feel Bad for My Neck"
2021	Doctors	Liv Keane	Episode: "Only Connect"
2021–present	Casualty	Stephanie 'Stevie' Nash	Main role

Video game voice roles
Year	Title	Role
2019	Jenny LeClue - Detectivú	Various
2021	Forza Horizon 5	Ekaterina 'Katya' Kalemagina
2022	Babylon's Fall	Corina's Mother

== Awards and nominations ==
Year	Award	Category	Nominated work	Result	Ref.
Unknown	Peter Akerman Awards	Best Comedy Actress	Herself	Won	
2000	PricewaterhouseCoopers	Leaders of Tomorrow	Herself	Runner-up	
2022	Inside Soap Awards	Best Drama Star	Casualty	Nominated	
2023	TRIC Awards	Soap Actor	Casualty	Nominated	
2023	Inside Soap Awards	Best Drama Star	Casualty	Nominated	
2024	Inside Soap Awards	Best Drama Star	Casualty	Nominated	
