= Neet Mohan =

British actor

- Born: Navneet Mohan; 11 November 1985 (age 41); Chesterfield, Derbyshire, England
- Occupation: Actor
- Years active: 2009–present
- Television: Line of Duty; No Offence; Casualty

Navneet "Neet" Mohan (born 11 November 1985) is an British actor. He is known for his roles as PC Taz Ahmed in the Channel 4 series No Offence (2017) and Rash Masum in the BBC medical drama Casualty (2017–present).

== Career ==
In 2012, Mohan joined the cast of Line of Duty in the role of PC Simon Bannerjee. From 2015 to 2017, he played PC Taz Ahmed on the Channel 4 television series No Offence. Then in 2017, Mohan began portraying the role of Dr. Rash Masum in the BBC medical drama Casualty. He also portrayed Rash in an episode of Holby City.

== Filmography ==
Year	Title	Role	Notes
2010	Psychoville	Waiter	
2011	Everywhere and Nowhere	Riz	
2011	Trishna	Sandeep	
2011	Aszaan	Aman Khan	
2011	Fresh Meat	Alex	Episode #1.6
2011–2012	Strike Back	Naveed	3 episodes
2012	All In Good Time	Jay Dutt	
2012	Line Of Duty	PC Simon Bannerjee	4 episodes
2012	Holby City	Jai Barbosa	Episode: "The Devil Will Come"
2015	Doctor Who	Chopra	
2015	Tommies	Aide de Camp/Chopra/Copplestone	6 episodes
2015–2017	No Offence	PC Taz Ahmed	15 episodes
2016	Saved	Peter	TV series
2017	Lies We Tell	Faz	
2017	Ransom	Dede	2 episodes
2017–present	Casualty	Rash Masum	Series regular
2019	Holby City	Rash Masum	Guest appearance

== Awards and nominations ==
Year	Ceremony	Category	Nominated work	Result	Ref.
2019	National Television Awards	Newcomer	Casualty	Nominated	
2020	TV Choice Awards	Best Actor	Casualty	Longlisted	
2022	Inside Soap Awards	Best Drama Star	Casualty	Longlisted	
2024	Inside Soap Awards	Best Drama Star	Casualty	Shortlisted	
