= Michael Stevenson (actor) =

English actor (born 1980)

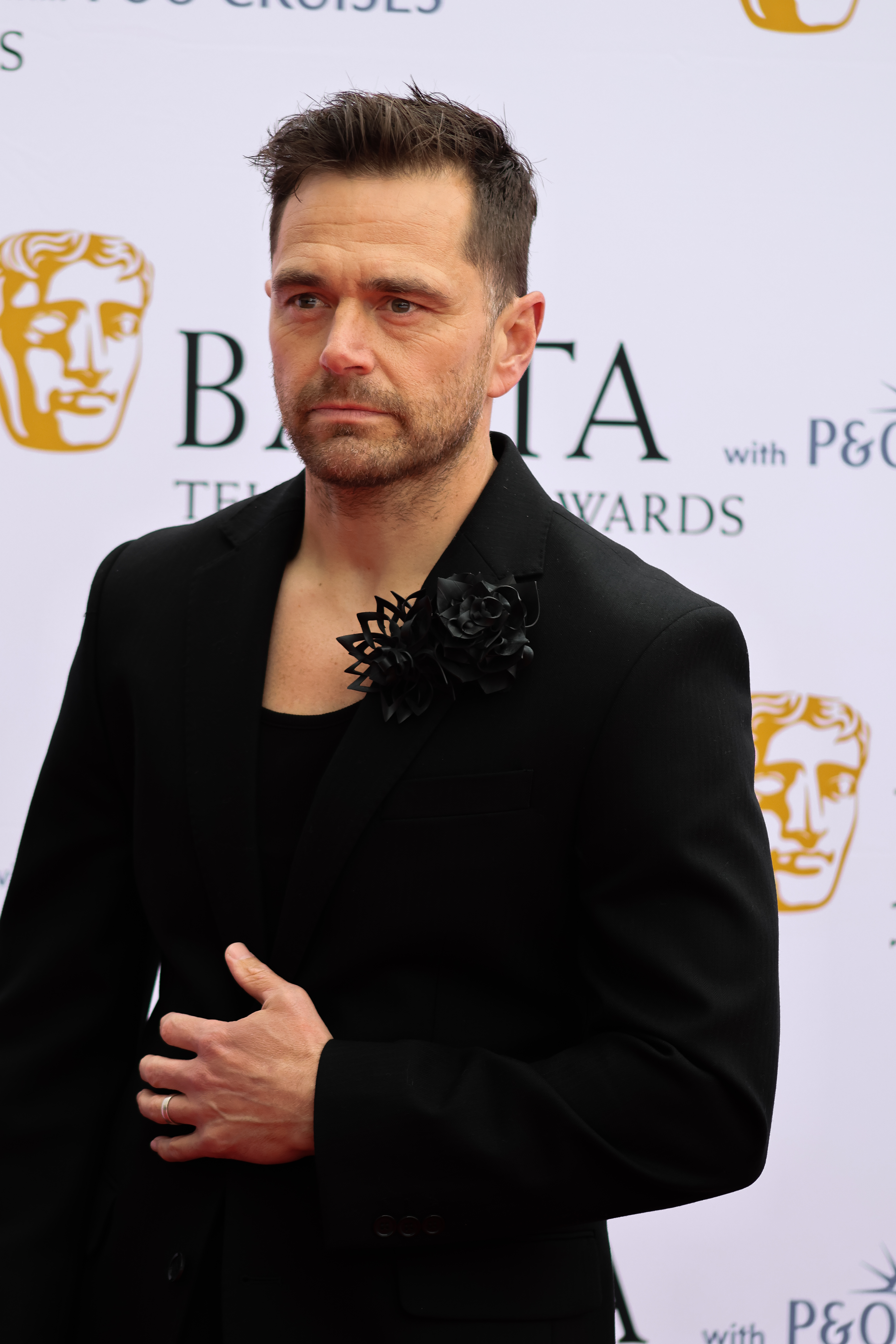
- Stevenson in 2026
- Born: Michael Thomas Stevenson; 2 October 1980 (age 45); Sheffield, England
- Occupation: Actor
- Years active: 2009–present
- Notable work: Iain Dean in Casualty
- Television: Casualty
- Spouse: Lauren Crace (m. 2016)
- Children: 3

Michael Thomas Stevenson (born 2 October 1980) is an English actor, known for playing Iain Dean in BBC medical drama Casualty from 2012 until 2019 and from 2021.

== Filmography ==
Year	Title	Role	Notes
2009	Heartbeat	Billy Garrett	1 episode
2012	Good Night	Joel	Short film
2012	A Thousand Empty Glasses	Arthur	Short film
2013	The Syndicate	Marcus	2 episodes
2013	Doctors	Judd Tinker	1 episode
2013	Moonlighting	John Doyle	Short film
2012–2019, 2021–present	Casualty	Iain Dean	Series regular
2016, 2017, 2019, 2021	Holby City	Iain Dean	4 episodes
2021	Innocent	Detective Constable Dave Green	Main role
