= Sarah Seggari =

English actress (born 1995)

- Born: Sarah Daniela Seggari; 12 July 1995 (age 30); London, England
- Education: Brit School; ArtsEd
- Occupation: Actress
- Years active: 2015–present
- Known for: Casualty

Sarah Daniela Seggari (born 12 July 1995) is an English actress, known for her role as Rida Amaan on the BBC medical drama series Casualty. Before joining the series, Seggari appeared in various stage productions including Much Ado About Nothing, The Comedy of Errors and Anna Karenina, as well as making appearances in television series such as I Hate Suzie and We Are Lady Parts.

== Life and career ==
Seggari was born on 12 July 1995 in London and is of Italian descent. She attended the BRIT School, after which she obtained a BA in acting at the Arts Educational Schools. She appeared in numerous stage productions whilst studying at both schools. After graduating, she continued to act on stage, in productions including The Comedy of Errors on a national tour with the Royal Shakespeare Company, Emilia at the Vaudeville Theatre and Anna Karenina at the Crucible Theatre. In 2020, she appeared in an episode of the Sky Atlantic series I Hate Suzie, later portraying Sabah in the Channel 4 comedy We Are Lady Parts. In 2023, she was cast in the BBC medical drama series Casualty as nurse Rida Amaan.

== Filmography ==
Year	Title	Role	Notes	Ref.
2017	Girl on a Swing	Lucy	Short film	
2020	I Hate Suzie	Chloe	Episode: "Shock"	
2020	The Emily Atack Show	Herself	2 episodes	
2021	We Are Lady Parts	Sabah	6 episodes	
2021	The Comedy of Errors	Luce	Television play	
2022	This Is Going to Hurt	Workshop Attendee	Episode #1.4	
2022	Life After Life	Renee	Episode #1.4	
2023	Slow Horses	Police Officer Moseley	Episode: "Negotiating with Tigers"	
2023–present	Casualty	Rida Amaan	Main role; 106 episodes	
2025	Studs	Mia	Short films	
2025	Croydon Cowgirl	Vivienne	Short films	
TBA	Much Ado About Nothing	Margaret	Television play	

== Stage ==
- After the Fall as Felice/Louise/Maggie
- Anna Karenina as various roles
- A Season in the Congo as Maurice Mpolo
- A Very Expensive Poison as various roles
- The Cherry Orchard as Anya
- The Comedy of Errors as various roles
- Earthquakes in London as Sarah
- Emilia as Lady Cordelia/Flora
- The Frontline as Erkenwald
- Human Suit as Malvina
- Keep Calm and Carry On as Lily
- Much Ado About Nothing as Margaret/Verges
- Pericles as Gower
- Port as Rachel/Christine
- Scan Artists as Adela
- The Suit as Dolls Mole
- Twelfth Night as Maria

== Awards and nominations ==
Year	Ceremony	Category	Nominated work	Result	Ref.
2024	Inside Soap Awards	Best Daytime Star	Casualty	Longlisted	
