= One (Casualty) =

- Casualty episode
- Episode no.: Series 31; Episode 45
- Directed by: Jon Sen
- Written by: Paul Unwin
- Cinematography by: Simon Butcher
- Original air date: 29 July 2017
- Running time: 53 minutes

Guest appearances
- Georgia Sandle as Diamond Whittaker; Kassius Nelson as Chloe Robinson; Sule Rimi as Dougie Cox; Gordon Kennedy as Andrew Sully; Dajay Brown as Chrissie Cox; Aewia Huillet as Sun-Mi; Trevor Cooper as Jerry Kennedy; Jenna Boyd as Candice-Marie Kennedy; Jenny Platt as Di Hawkins; Pameli Benham as Rose Thomas; Harry Lovell-Jones as Anthony Cleaver

Episode chronology
← Previous "Somewhere Between Silences – Part Two"	Next → "Episode 1050"
- Casualty series 31

"One" is the thirty-first series finale of the British medical drama television series Casualty and the 1,049th episode of the overall series. The episode is written by Paul Unwin, the show's co-creator, and directed by Jon Sen. It premiered on BBC One and BBC One HD on 29 July 2017. "One" is a fly on the wall episode following an hour in Holby City Hospital's emergency department (ED) with additional focus on sister Lisa "Duffy" Duffin (Cathy Shipton) mentoring two work experience girls and paramedic Jez Andrews (Lloyd Everitt) grieving the death of a baby.

"One" pays homage to Casualty and the National Health Service (NHS); executive producer Oliver Kent stated that it recognises the efforts of the NHS, while actress Amanda Mealing said it showcases the challenges faced by the NHS. Producers began planning "One" in 2016, with an idea of producing a live episode. After this was ruled out due to technical difficulties, Unwin settled on an episode filmed in one take. Crew members questioned whether it would be possible, while there was a mixed response from cast members. Most of the cast were trained in theatre so relied on their training for filming, whereas the crew did not have this luxury and found the experience scary.

Filming took place in early April 2017. Cast rehearsed the script in twelve sections, before piecing the sections together and filming it twice every day. "One" was filmed in one take using one mobile camera, which covered 360-degree shots. 35 radio microphones and 6 booms were hidden into the set, while 26 actors wore body microphones. Multiple methods for capturing film and sound used in regular episodes had to be changed for "One". To capture the entirety of the serial's set, a camera operator was lifted down a 17 feet drop in a harness while recording a scene. The production team wore medical scrubs on-set in case they were caught on camera.

The episode was promoted through promotional trailers, a Twitter hashtag, and a countdown on social media. Within a 28-day period, 6.57 million viewers watched the episode. "One" received a mixed response from viewers and television critics alike. Some viewers criticised the camera movement in the episode, stating that they felt "disoriented" watching it. Alison Graham of the Radio Times called the episode a "bold piece of television" while Jessica Ransom of What's on TV felt the episode highlighted the disorderly nature of an ED. The Daily Telegraph critic Michael Hogan gave the episode a mixed review, opining that although the episode was directed and performed well, the script was poor and "needed some doctoring of its own".

== Plot ==
Paramedics Jez Andrews (Lloyd Everitt) and Iain Dean (Michael Stevenson) are called to a house fire. Jez is inside and searches for casualties in the house. He finds none and pulls Sun-Mi (Aewia Huillet) from the burning building. Iain and Jez take Sun-Mi to the ambulance. Sun-Mi pulls her oxygen mask from her face and tells Jez her baby is inside the house. Jez prepares to rush back in, but the house explodes before he can get in.

Jez and Iain drive to the emergency department; they encounter a male who has come off his motorbike after colliding with a car. They request another ambulance and continue to the ED. As the pair arrive, sister Lisa "Duffy" Duffin (Cathy Shipton) greets two schoolgirls: Diamond Whittaker (Georgia Sandle) and Chloe Robinson (Kassius Nelson). Duffy is tasked with acting as Diamond and Chloe's mentor.

Sun-Mi is taken into Resus to be treated by consultant Connie Beauchamp (Amanda Mealing) and nurses Charlie Fairhead (Derek Thompson) and Robyn Miller (Amanda Henderson). Duffy tells Diamond and Chloe to wait outside Resus, but Diamond ignores Duffy's instructions and walks in. When Duffy finds the pair in Resus, she gives them a warning but is then called over to treat Sun-Mi. Duffy hands Chloe and Diamond over to Charlie to look after them. As Jez is collecting a drink from the vending machine, he receives news from nurse Jacob Masters (Charles Venn) that Sun-Mi's baby was found and taken out of the house; Jez is ecstatic.

Consultants Dylan Keogh (William Beck) and Elle Gardner (Jaye Griffiths) work together to treat patient Dougie Cox (Sule Rimi) in Resus. Charlie asks a nurse to look after Diamond and Chloe, who are then passed onto Jacob and then passed over to Iain. In the staff room, Jacob reveals to Iain in front of Diamond and Chloe that Sun-Mi's baby died in the house fire. When Jez walks into the staff room, Diamond apologises to Jez, who is heartbroken upon learning Sun-Mi's baby died. Andrew Sully (Gordon Kennedy), Sun-Mi's husband, is devastated by his and his wife’s loss. He later learns that Dougie was behind the fire after throwing a petrol bomb through the window.

Duffy finds Diamond and Chloe filing paperwork in Jacob’s office. Registrar Lily Chao (Crystal Yu) asks Duffy, Chloe, and Diamond for a selfie. Chloe reveals to Lily and Duffy she wants to be a nurse. Duffy takes Chloe and Diamond to the front of the ED, as she explains why she chose to become a nurse and make a difference in people's lives.

== Production ==
External videos
- "One Shot"; A promotional trailer for the episode
- "Crisis"; A promotional trailer for the episode
- "One (Preview Clip)"; A clip of Chloe and Diamond arriving at the ED

=== Conception and development ===
"One" was written by the show's co-creator Paul Unwin, who had not written regularly for the serial since its second series. Jon Sen directed the episode, while Erika Hossington served as the series producer and Oliver Kent acted as the executive producer for his final episode. Hossington and Simon Harper, Kent's successor as executive producer, were overjoyed by Unwin's return. Hossington enjoyed the episode's script. Unwin and Sen felt privileged to be involved in "One"; Sen called the episode a "once-in-a-lifetime opportunity" and "an amazing bit of film-making".

"This very special episode will give the audience a unique insight into an hour in A&E. It will be an intense, emotional hour where staff and patients are faced with life-changing events. We want to reflect the front line in its unedited, rawest form, and this one-shot episode with a brilliant script from Casualty creator Paul Unwin, has given us the opportunity to do that."

—Series producer Erika Hossington on the episode. (2017)

"One" is a fly-on-the-wall episode exploring life at the emergency department (ED) of Holby City Hospital, the setting for Casualty. Specifically, the episode focuses on Sister Lisa "Duffy" Duffin (Cathy Shipton) mentoring two girls, Chloe (Kassius Nelson) and Diamond (Georgia Sandle), who are on work experience in the ED as they decide whether to pursue a career in medicine. Duncan Lindsay, writing for the Metro, reported that the events of the episode would challenge Duffy both "emotionally and professionally". The episode sees an increased focus on the ED's nursing staff, which Shipton described as "a lovely echo back to the show's origins". She liked the additional focus since the nurses "soak everything up in emergencies". Shipton felt "One" reflects original Casualty producer Geraint Morris' aim to portray nurses as being at the front of emergency departments.

At the beginning of the episode, Diamond is portrayed as a stuck-up young girl who wants to become a consultant, while Chloe is displayed as worried and agitated, struggling with her surroundings. Shipton stated that the characters' personalities change during the course of the episode: Diamond is taught to be more respectful, whereas Chloe's confidence grows and she decides to spend more time in the ED.

"One" was billed as "unique", "extraordinary", "pioneering" and "ambitious". Shipton called it "classic Casualty" and described it as "Casualty bumped into Mike Leigh bumped into a living art installation". A BBC Online reporter branded the episode the serial's "most challenging episode yet". Cast member Amanda Mealing (Connie Beauchamp) described "One" as "a love letter to the NHS". She added that since the complex format featured in "One" is not often used, the episode would be "exciting and new". Hossington similarly thought the episode is complex and alternative, adding that "One" would excite fans of the show because it is unattempted. Mealing's co-star Crystal Yu called the episode "different and magical" and branded it "an amazing experience". Unwin used "One" as an opportunity to pay homage to Casualty and the NHS. Kent believed that the episode recognises what "the heroes of the NHS really do", while Sen opined that "One" is the greatest way of the audience being able to witness the NHS. Mealing explained that "One" should symbolise the drama and outstanding efforts of the NHS. She believed that the episode demonstrates "the numerous pressures and obstacles" tackled by the NHS, as well as the efforts and dedication needed to run an emergency department. On the episode, Mealing commented, "It starts with a bang and the excitement and high drama continue right to the end." Sen said that "One" features emotional scenes when characters' personalities are challenged by emergency situations.

Planning for "One" began in 2016, with show bosses keen to attempt something new. Shipton stated that an obvious suggestion is a live episode, but accepted that it was out of the show's capabilities. Hossington later explained that the show cannot transmit live because it goes through several post-production procedures which would not be possible if they transmitted live. She told Sophie Dainty of Digital Spy that the show would not appear or sound like the regular show. After discovering the 2015 film Victoria, Unwin considered an episode filmed in one take. In September 2016, Unwin informed Shipton of his plans to write a one-shot episode to conclude the thirty-first series. The idea was met with apprehension from Shipton, who believed it was a joke. However, Hossington thought Unwin's plans created a nice way to conclude the series as it varies to regular episodes. Lead sound recordist Tim Hunt was approached with the idea in June 2016, although he was apprehensive about it and spent the following summer questioning whether it could be achieved. Hunt understood that "One" would need to be filmed using a wide shot angle, which he believed would create problems as "you see everything". Plans for the episode started to circulate in the media in August 2016 when Hossington and Kent promised that Casualty would complete "[their] version of a live episode at some point". When rumours began circulating on-set, plans for the episode were confirmed to the cast. At the 22nd National Television Awards in January 2017, Hossington hinted to Shipton that she would feature prominently in the episode. The actress later found an unreleased script for the episode, which she stole to read. After reading the script, her confidence in the episode grew.

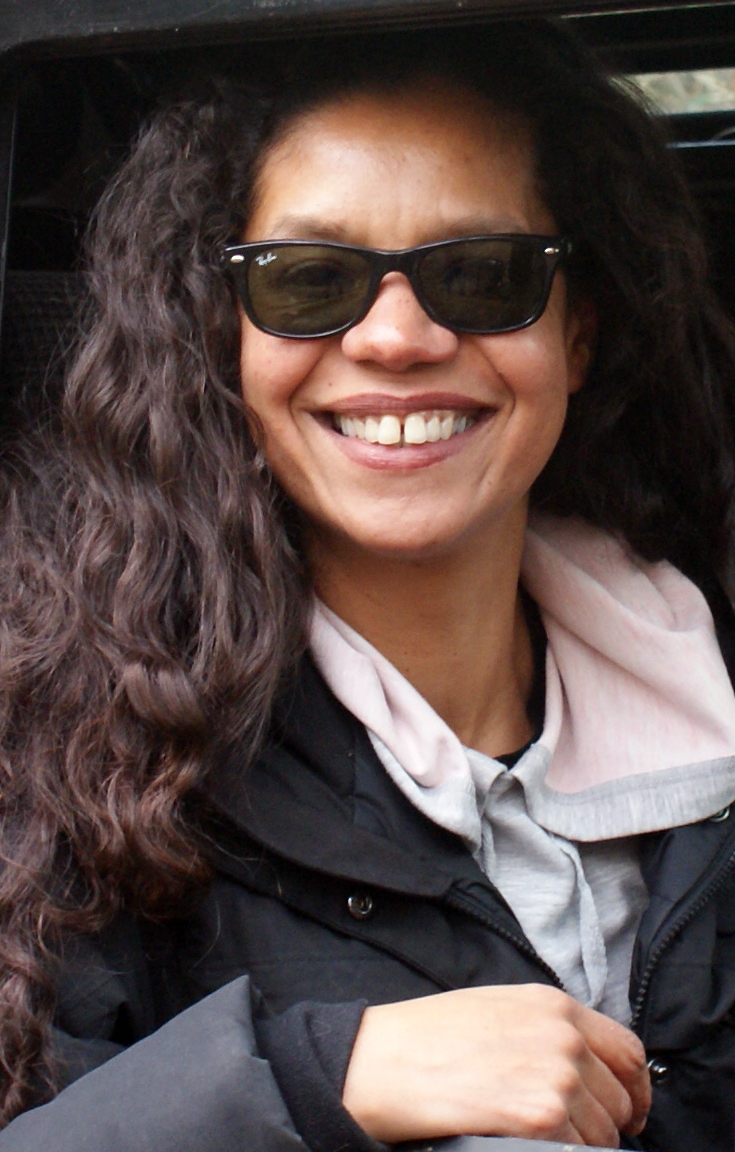
Jaye Griffiths, who portrays Elle Gardner in the drama, struggled to understand the concept of the episode.

In August 2016, Casualty actor William Beck expressed an interest in filming a live episode, which left him in disagreement with his co-star Jaye Griffiths as she did not want to film a live episode. Griffiths later stated that she struggled to "grasp" the concept of the episode initially. Conversely, Yu was pleased to be involved in the episode and Shipton found the experience "exciting and nerve-wracking". Mealing admitted in an interview with Catrin Carrucan of The Daily Express that she was apprehensive about creating "One" because she believed the cast would have limited rehearsal time as they already work with a "really tight schedule". The majority of the cast were trained in theatre so were able to rely on their training for the episode. Shipton stated that the crew found the experience scary in comparison as they are usually able to "stop and start" production. The actress also mentioned that the cast could improvise if they botch their lines. Shipton previously performed in a one-woman show, which prepared her for the episode. This helped calm her nerves as she felt if she botched her lines, it would reflect real life. However, to help her concentrate, Shipton called her co-stars by their character names on and off set. Yu's character Lily Chao appears halfway through "One" so she hoped that she would not botch her lines, especially since she had much medical jargon to say.

=== Filming ===
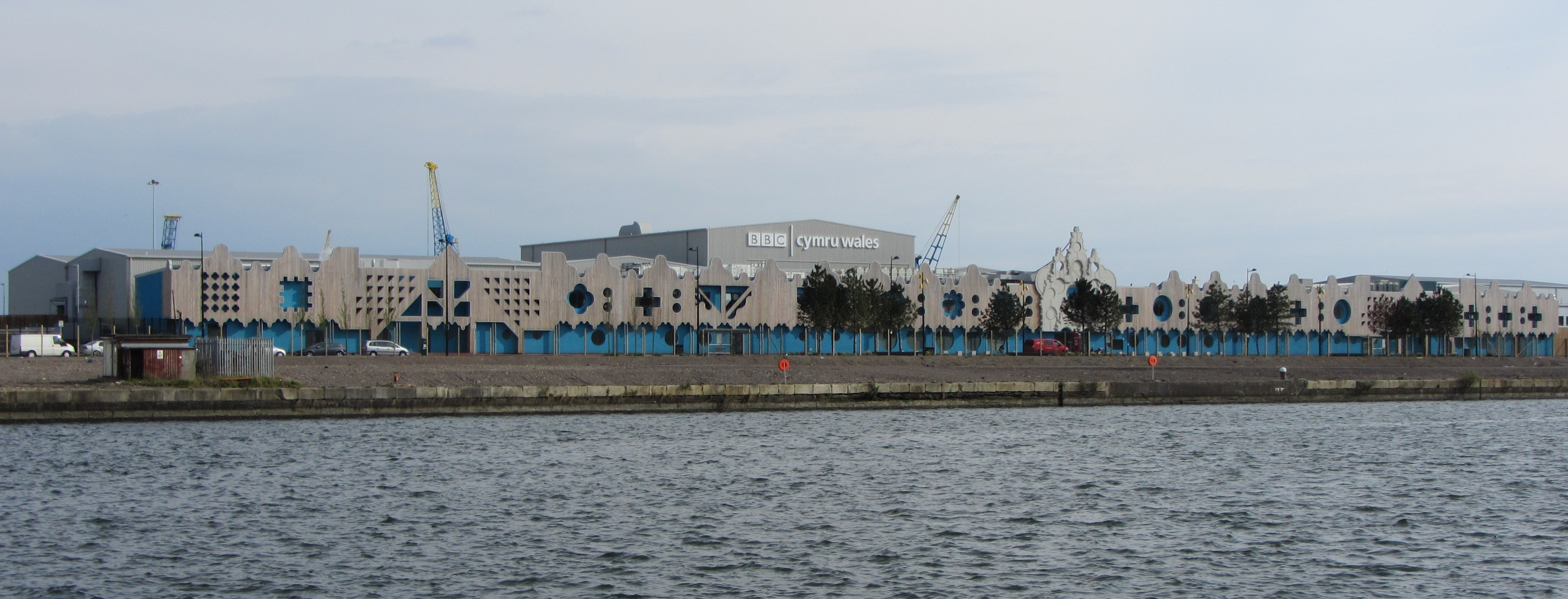
"One" was filmed at Roath Lock Studios, located in Cardiff, where the serial has been produced since 2011.

Show filming is located at Roath Lock Studios, Cardiff, where it has taken place since 2011. Production for the episode took place over two weeks, beginning on 3 April 2017 and ending on 13 April 2017. Guest actors were invited to visit the studios throughout the week before filming so that they could familiarise themselves with their surroundings. Cast began rehearsing in the first week of production. To help this process, the script for "One" was split into twelve sections for individual rehearsal. Across the first week, cast and crew began to compile sections together. Hossington said that after rehearsing the first half of the episode, there was a positive atmosphere on-set. During rehearsals, press and media were invited to observe and for a guided tour around the set while speaking to the crew. A recorded dress rehearsal took place on 8 April. Hossington and Sen thought it would be "a complete and utter shambles" but confessed it went well and felt it looked good to an audience. Filming commenced in the final week of production; it was recorded twice every day and the best take was selected at the conclusion of filming. Production for "One" took longer than for regular episodes as the cast had to "meticulously rehearse" their scenes. Filming also took longer because if any mistakes were made, they had to restart the take.

The pre-title sequence, which features a house explosion, was filmed separately to the rest of filming for practical reasons, although Shipton stated that everything after the opening sequence was "48 minutes of continuous filming". The explosion was also filmed in one take and at a similar time to studio filming. Julian Spencer, the episode's stunt coordinator, found the explosion sequence challenging due to the one-shot element, although he thought it went well and said that it was "raw". Neighbours to the house used for filming the explosion were warned about possible "disturbance" during filming beforehand and the two houses facing the stunt house had their windows covered to avoid debris from the explosion breaking them. Eyewitnesses to the explosion said that film-makers made the explosion appear "authentic". Sen labelled the stunt "a big explosive − in every sense of the word − beginning".

"Something kinda [sic] went 'Actually, we are gonna do this'. We're very glad that we pushed in terms of taking people upstairs and pushing the envelope on kinda [sic] what could be achieved within the one-shot."

—Director Jon Sen reflects on his decision to use the show's full set. (2017)

The show's production team wanted to capture all of the show's set, using it similarly to a stage and decided to include a scene where Duffy, Chloe, and Diamond walk upstairs to the pharmacy. To achieve this scene, camera operator Scott Milton was asked to walk backwards upstairs, before being attached to a harness and asked to "step out over a ledge 17 feet above the ground". Sen suggested the idea and despite his colleagues believing he was "insane", he included it at what he said was a "pivotal moment". Milton admitted that the adrenalin rush associated with the stunt made it "electric". Shipton described the situation as hazardous. Mealing explained that Sen did not want the episode to be "safe" and insisted on performing this scene. She commented, "The possible limits of doing a one-shot have not contained anyone's ambitions." Mealing stated that from a technical point of view, the episode contrasts to a regular episode. She explained that while the audience only sees her character Connie walking down a corridor, she was actually walking towards 40 members of the production team, including a camera operator, who are walking backward. Michael Stevenson, who portrays Iain Dean, said that "One" uses an alternative method as "everything is in the moment", which increased the pace of filming and therefore, the episode. On the quick-paced nature of the episode, cast member Derek Thompson quipped, "Characters come through the door, put on a pair of skates and then, they are danced off."

The show's production team were dressed in medical scrubs so that if they were caught on camera, they would look like a background character. One member of the sound department opted to wear a stethoscope so they could disguise themselves; Hossington praised their dedication, while Sen believed that it "added to the sanctification". Hossington explained that they were "very careful" to ensure that everyone was dressed accordingly, while Sen revealed that there was "a massive amount of excitement" about being able to dress in the scrubs. During the episode, Chloe is shown vomiting, which raised challenges for the production team. Sen explained that in a regular episode, a cut would be inserted where the actor would place fake vomit, often chicken soup disguised by the art department, in their mouth before 'vomitting' and cutting to another scene, where the fake vomit is consequently cleaned up. However, in this episode, they could not use any cuts and as Nelson is a vegan, they could not use chicken soup as fake vomit. Sen described these as "little challenges".

Shipton believed she would be exhausted, yet "exhilarated" after filming the episode, which would make her hysterical approximately three days after the end of filming. She later said that she was "in a state of numb disbelief and excitement" after filming the episode, stating that she was proud of the achievement. She added that she woke the following morning wanting to film the episode again. Yu also found the filming exhausting and spent most of the following weekend asleep. Stevenson enjoyed the filming of the episode, praising the show's production team for their work behind the scenes. He also thought the episode showcased the show's production team for being "the very tight company that we are". Shipton praised Sen's motivational techniques and the morale between the cast and crew. Mealing praised each person associated with "One" for their work, opining they did so with "great pride, belief and perspiration". She also specifically praised the crew, who she said "must be absolutely awesome" if they are able to create such an episode, while Hossington believed that the episode would not be completed to a greater standard if a different cast and crew created it. Unwin opined that the episode was a "fantastic achievement", created by a "remarkable" cast, crew, and production team. On the result of filming the episode, Mealing commented, "It brought cast and crew together in the best possible way. Everyone relished the opportunity to step up their game." Similarly, Hossington said that the episode positively impacted the cast and crew as they felt they "achieved something".

==== Camera and sound ====
The episode was filmed in one take using one mobile camera, which was required to be cable free and able to film inside a moving ambulance. The show's ambulance station set was transformed into a crew control room and 35 radio microphones and 6 booms were hidden and disguised into the set. The episode features 360-degree shots to cover a wider range of the scenes. Two booms were used in exterior scenes and Hunt explained that the second boom was used "to solve any shadows on a 360 shot". A normal episode features one production sound mixer, two boom operators, and an assistant; for "One", a second production sound mixer and two further boom operators were introduced. Brad Bower covered the roles of one of the two production sound mixer and the assistant, which required him to support the cast and crew during rehearsals, adjust gains, disguise on-set microphones, and supervise the recording machines during takes. Hunt wanted to "match the sound of conventional Casualty episodes", although he was unable to create this in the way it is achieved in a regular episode so was forced to use radio microphones instead. In addition to this, 26 actors wore a body microphone and one actor wore two body microphones and a transmitter, which Hunt said allowed the actor to "cover the dynamics of his performance". Sen explained that the strategy to sound was not the same as regular episodes because background actors are normally asked to mime to assist with the cuts, whereas in this episode there were no cuts. Kent said that from a technical aspect, "One" was "the most enormous challenge". Hossington said that the technical aspects of the episode were the focus of production.

The role of camera operator was shared between two people due to the weight of the camera and the "incredible act of concentration" needed for the position as it is easy to get tired. Sen wanted a shot going above the patient, which he found was a good opportunity to exchange the camera between the two operators. The camera was handed to Milton, the second cameraman, as it moves over the patient. The camera was later handed back to the original camera operator, who received the camera during a fight scene in the ED staff room. Sen praised the camera operators and opined that their work was "seamless". A heated viewfinder was purchased for the camera as the regular viewfinder became misty easily, preventing filming. Hossington explained that as a heated viewfinder had not been used on-set before, they were unsure how much battery capacity it would use. Sen worked with the show's cinematographers to achieve the best camera angles and perfect the scenes. Yu called this "exciting" and compared it to "watching a master-plan coming together".

Hossington thought that one challenge of the ambulance ride sequence was the positioning of the director of photography. The director was required to control the iris of the camera by "opening and closing" it using a control, which is unable to communicate with the iris through metal. Hossington said that it was easier to navigate the director and the iris controls during the pre-titles stunt and the majority of the episode, which is set in the hospital, than in the ambulance because there was not enough space for the director to be in the ambulance as well as to several other members of the production team. Hossington believed that the demanding nature of the ambulance journey would be astounding to the audience as it appeared to be "seamless". A fake wall was created in the ambulance surrounding the passenger seat so that a member of the production team could position themselves while not being seen on camera. Sen explained that he was determined not to allow "the technical stuff dictate how we were doing it".

For his role, guest actor Harry Lovell-Jones had to repeatedly drum against a chair using drumsticks. Hossington and Sen found this difficult to achieve with sound as they were concerned it may be "interfering" or "obscured" and questioned "whether there was too much, [or] too little" drumming. So that a constant drumming could be heard during scenes in the reception area, microphones were hidden in the ceiling panels and underneath Lovell-Jones' seat. Hossington believed that she and Sen had spent the equivalent of a day discussing the sound of the drumsticks. Hossington also revealed that the drumsticks were originally rubber to avoid creating masses of noise, but were instead swapped for sticks made from balsa wood so that they could be snapped. She also expressed worry with the snapping of the drumsticks, so was thankful that nothing went wrong.

=== Promotion and broadcast ===
At the time of the episode's announcement, the episode was scheduled for Summer 2017. Sarah Ellis of Inside Soap later revealed "One" would air in July, and the episode broadcast in the United Kingdom on 29 July 2017 on BBC One. A trailer for "One" was released on 15 July 2017, two weeks before its premiere. Another trailer for the "One" was released on 26 July 2017 featuring short clips from the episode to the pace of a heartbeat. The show's social media team created the Twitter hashtag "#CasualtyOne" for the episode to increase the episode's media profile, and in the buildup to the episode airing, they created a countdown to the episode's broadcast.

== Reception ==
=== Ratings ===
"One" received an overnight rating of 5.2 million viewers, which was the highest-rated episode of 29 July 2017 and the serial's highest rating since 2015. After seven days, the ratings rose to 6.27 million viewers. This was a rise of 790,000 viewers from the previous episode. After 28 days, the ratings rose to 6.57 million viewers, an overall increase of 900,000 viewers from the previous episode. "One" was the second most-watched programme on BBC One in the week of broadcast and the eighth most-watched programme on BBC One in July 2017.

=== Critical analysis ===
"The bold project was cleverly choreographed by director Jon Sen and wholeheartedly performed by the cast. Yet it was let down by a clunking script that needed some doctoring of its own."

—The Daily Telegraph critic Michael Hogan on the episode. (2017)

Reilly (What's on TV) called the episode "mesmerising", while Catrin Carrucan (The Daily Express) described the episode as "dramatic". Joseph Gamp of Metro labelled the episode "daring" and "ambitious". Charles Venn, who portrays Jacob Masters, praised cast members' "sublime" performance in "One". Many viewers complained on Twitter about the camera movements, which they claimed made them "queasy", "disoriented" and "dizzy", as well as some sound complications. Other viewers praised the episode, with viewers' comments including, "Excellent episode. Realistically creating the often frenetic and stressful situations in an ED" and "Blimey. Casualty is a work of art tonight." While some viewers expressed their enjoyment about the house explosion at the beginning of the episode, comparing it to "stock footage" from Game of Thrones, and others criticised the decision to film the whole episode in one-shot. Metro polled its readers on their reaction to the episode: 45% of readers enjoyed "One", but preferred the regular format; 33% of readers found the episode "great"; and 22% of readers did not like the episode and agreed that it was "really disorientating and dull".

Alison Graham, writing for the Radio Times, described "One" as a "bold piece of television" and praised the show for "shaking things up a bit" for the series finale and for displaying "the chaos of a front-line service". She also called the off-screen death of the child "tragic". Graham also opined that the "frenetic" atmosphere in the episode made her feel "seasick" as the camera followed a character before "swiftly changing paths to latch on to another". Helen McWilliams of Break A Leg enjoyed the episode, which she branded "a gamble that paid off" and a "history making episode". She believed "One" had an alternative "feel, ambience and atmosphere" to other episodes. She praised the performances of Shipton and Everitt and said that Everitt "knocked his performance out of the park in extreme circumstances", while Shipton created "one of the performances of her career". McWilliams believed that the absence of regular character Noel Garcia (Tony Marshall) reminded the audience that all ED staff are "integral cogs" within the department. The reviewer also called Chloe and Diamond "a fantastic addition to the chaos" and believed their clashing personalities were realistic, hoping for the characters to return in the future.

Michael Hogan of The Daily Telegraph awarded "One" a score of 3 out of 5, calling the episode a "bold project" and the house explosion "spectacular". He said that the death of the baby provided "One" with an "emotional heart", while the fly-on-the-wall theme created "intensity and realism" within the episode. He praised the decision to have Shipton and Thompson lead the episode. The reviewer also opined that some speeches from the characters "didn’t quite work" and found the explanations during the episode "jarring". Sue Haasler, writing for the blog Pauseliveaction, liked "One" and stated that she forgot it was filmed in one take, which was a "testament" to the cast. She enjoyed the "seamless" approach and the decision for the crew to wear medical scrubs. Haasler said that the choreography was "nothing short of incredible" and believed that Unwin and Sen "brilliantly thought out" the episode and injected "dynamics and pace" into it. By the end of the episode, Haasler was "emotional" and glad that the episode was created as "a love letter to the NHS". Jessica Ransom of What's on TV praised the episode and found it "impressive" that there were no mistakes. She said the episode highlighted the "ever chaotic trauma" and a "particularly explosive day" in the ED. Ransom also opined that Chloe and Diamond were "meddlesome".
