= Casualty series 31 =

Thirty-first series of Casualty

Casualty
- Series 31
- Starring: William Beck; Jamie Davis; Jason Durr; Lloyd Everitt; Jaye Griffiths; Chelsea Halfpenny; Amanda Henderson; Tony Marshall; Amanda Mealing; Azuka Oforka; George Rainsford; Michael Stevenson; Cathy Shipton; Derek Thompson; Charles Venn; Richard Winsor; Crystal Yu
- No. of episodes: 44

Release
- Original network: BBC One; BBC One HD
- Original release: 27 August 2016 – 29 July 2017

Series chronology
- ← Previous; Series 30 Next → Series 32

The thirty-first series of the British medical drama television series Casualty commenced airing in the United Kingdom on BBC One on 27 August 2016 and finished on 29 July 2017. The series consisted of 44 episodes, including the show's feature-length thirtieth anniversary special episode, "Too Old for This Shift". Erika Hossington continued her role as series producer, while Oliver Kent continued his role as the show's executive producer until the end of the series.

Seventeen cast members reprised their roles from the previous series with original character Lisa "Duffy" Duffin returning to the series as part of the show's thirtieth anniversary. Rik Makarem appeared in the series between October 2016 and January 2017 as first year foundation doctor (F1) Sebastian Grayling. This series also featured the death of regular character Caleb Knight (Richard Winsor), who has appeared since series 28.

The opening episode of the series was a special feature-length episode, celebrating thirty years of the medical drama. The episode featured main character crossovers from Holby City, with Jac Naylor (Rosie Marcel), Henrik Hanssen (Guy Henry) and Adrian "Fletch" Fletcher (Alex Walkinshaw) appearing in the episode. Various former characters who have appeared in previous series throughout the thirty years of broadcast also made guest appearances during the episode. The episode features both the main characters lives, and the hospital itself in danger when an air ambulance crashed in the emergency department car park. The episode was watched by 7.20 million viewers. A special soundtrack was recorded for the episode, by the BBC National Orchestra of Wales. The series concluded with a special episode, "One", filmed in a single-take, using one camera, forty microphones and five boom operators. Show co-creator Paul Unwin returned to the show to write the episode.

The series was well received by fans and critics alike. They enjoyed the opening episode and opined that the show deserved an award, but an air ambulance charity thought the episode was thoughtless. On 25 January 2017, Casualty was awarded Best Drama at the National Television Awards. On 11 April 2017, the show was nominated for Best Soap & Continuing Drama at the BAFTAs, but was unsuccessful. The helicopter crash won the award for Best Drama Storyline at the 2017 Inside Soap Awards; Charlie and Duffy's wedding and Cal's murder also received a nomination in the category.

== Production ==
Oliver Kent continued his role as executive producer, whilst Erika Hossington remained as the series producer. Kent was appointed Head of Continuing Drama Series for BBC Scripted Studios in late 2016, with Simon Harper, series producer of Holby City at the time, subsequently being appointed acting executive producer of both shows. Harper was later promoted to the show's official executive producer on 8 June 2017, although Kent was credited in the role of executive producer until the end of the series. Mark Catley, the show's story consultant, was credited as co-executive producer for the first episode only. The thirty-first series consisted of 44 episodes.

The feature-length anniversary episode that began the series, aired for 99-minutes on 27 August 2016, and featured a storyline event that connected Casualty with its sister show Holby City. The BBC National Orchestra of Wales recorded a special soundtrack for the episode at BBC Hoddinott Hall in Cardiff Bay. Plans for the special were teased back in August 2014, when Hossington hinted that the show would do something "no other show had done before". In an interview with What's on TV, Charles Venn revealed that his character, Jacob Masters, would have a key role in the anniversary special. He added that cast and crew members were nicknaming the episode "Casualty: The Movie" while it was being filmed. Kent later stated that the episode would make the audience "gasp, laugh and cry buckets".

Hossington teased the series finale in an interview with Sophie Dainty of Digital Spy, promising to give viewers "a live experience" without making a live episode. She described the episode as "special and unique" and said it would be "something that the show has never, ever done before." Hossington also promised several stunts, including a "really big falling stunt within the hospital" in the latter half of the series. Further details on the series finale were revealed on 5 April 2017, where it was announced that the episode, "One", will be shot in a single-take, using one camera, 40 microphones and five boom operators. The finale was one hour long and was written by the show's co-creator, Paul Unwin. Hossington said the special episode would "give the audience a unique insight into an hour in A&E". She added that the episode would be "intense" and "emotional".

== Cast ==
=== Overview ===
The thirty-first series of Casualty features a cast of characters working in the emergency department of Holby City Hospital. The majority of the cast from the previous series continue to appear in this series. Amanda Mealing appears as clinical lead and consultant in emergency medicine and cardiothoracic surgeon Connie Beauchamp, whilst Jaye Griffiths and William Beck appear as consultants Elle Gardner, who also briefly acted as clinical lead, and Dylan Keogh. George Rainsford, Richard Winsor and Crystal Yu portray speciality registrars Ethan Hardy, Caleb "Cal" Knight and Lily Chao. Chelsea Halfpenny appears as Alicia Munroe, a second year foundation doctor (F2). Charles Venn portrays clinical nurse manager Jacob Masters, whilst Derek Thompson stars as senior charge nurse Charlie Fairhead, who has appeared in the show since its conception. Amanda Henderson, Azuka Oforka and Jason Durr play staff nurses Robyn Miller, Louise Tyler and David Hide. Michael Stevenson and Lloyd Everitt star as paramedics Iain Dean and Jez Andrews. Tony Marshall and Jamie Davis appear as receptionist and porter Noel Garcia and Max Walker respectively. Emily Carey and Owain Arthur appear as Grace Beauchamp-Strachan and Glen Thomas in a recurring capacity.

It was announced on 7 June 2016 that, following three guest appearances in the previous series, Cathy Shipton had returned to the show as a regular cast member. Her character, Lisa "Duffy" Duffin, who appeared in the show across various stints since its inception, returned in the opening episode of the series. Of Shipton's return, Kent said, "All of us at Casualty are incredibly excited that the fabulous Cathy Shipton has agreed to bring Duffy back to the Emergency Department." Arthur made his final appearance in episode 9 when his character Glen Thomas jilts his fiancée, Robyn Miller (Henderson). Tom Chambers guest appeared in episode 3 as Sam Strachan, Grace's father, following two appearances in the previous series. Chambers was a regular cast member in the show's spin-off show, Holby City, between 2006 and 2008. Hossington announced that Sam would be reintroduced to the series after receiving a job as the hospital's medical director. Sam returned in episode 24. Chambers later revealed that he would be leaving at the end of his contract due to a prior commitment. It was announced on 7 February 2017 that the show had filmed a funeral for a regular character, and episode 33 featured the death of Cal Knight (Winsor) after he was stabbed by a white supremacist who blamed Ethan for his father's death. Winsor decided to leave the series of his own accord, but was initially surprised to discover his character would be killed off, before coming round to the idea.

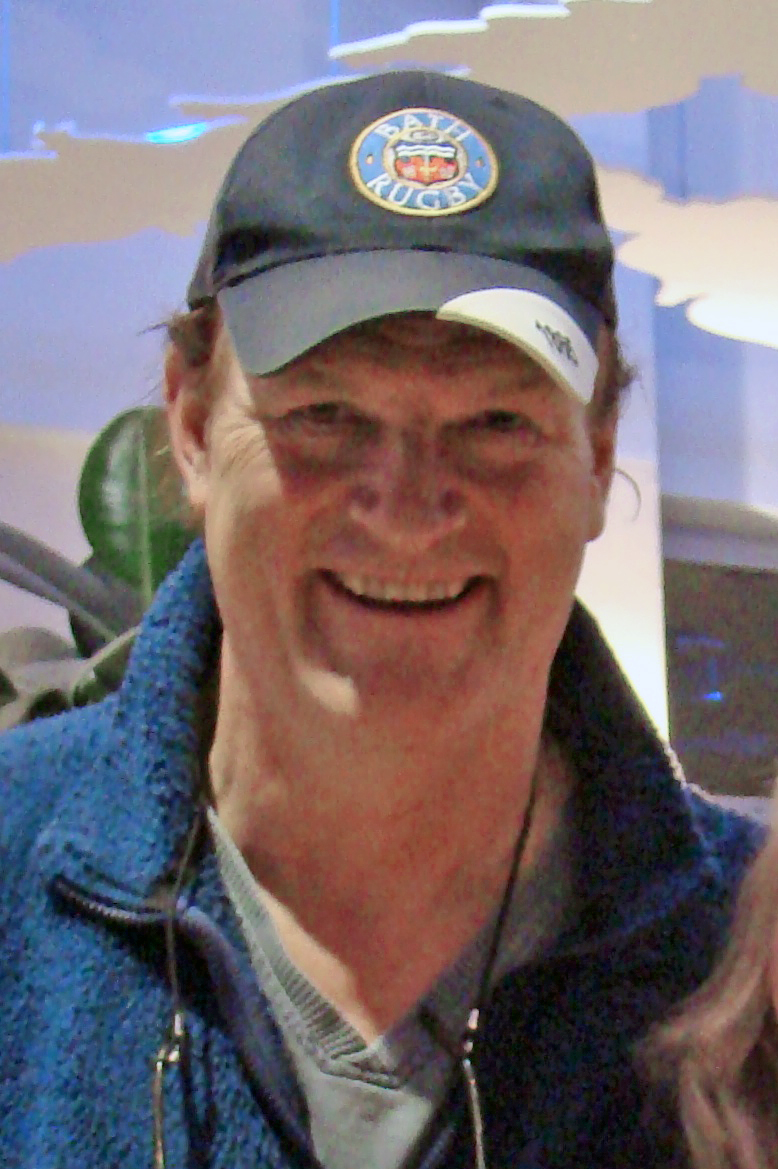
Clive Mantle reprised his role as Mike Barrett for a cameo appearance.

Several former regular cast members reprised their roles and made a cameo appearance within the show's feature-length opening episode, which included: Mackenzie "Big Mac" Chalker (Charles Dale), who departed the show in the previous series; Tess Bateman (Suzanne Packer), who appeared in the show for twelve years; Jay Faldren (Ben Turner), who appeared between 2008 and 2011; John "Abs" Denham (James Redmond), who departed from the show in 2008; Alice Chantrey (Sam Grey), who appeared in the show for over four years; Mike Barratt (Clive Mantle), who appeared in the show between 1993 and 1998; Comfort Jones (Martina Laird), who left the show in 2006; and Lenny Lyons (Steven Miller) who appeared in the show for three years. Ian Bleasdale also reprised the role of Josh Griffiths, one of the show's longest-serving characters, for the entirety of the episode. Bleasdale made a further three appearances in the series as Josh in episodes 20, 21 and 36. Russell Boulter reprised his role as Ryan Johnson for two episodes to resolve a storyline about his estranged marriage to Duffy.

During the feature-length special, three characters from Holby City made guest appearances: hospital chief executive officer (CEO) Henrik Hanssen (Guy Henry), cardiothoracic surgeon and clinical lead of Darwin ward Jac Naylor (Rosie Marcel), and ward manager of the AAU Adrian "Fletch" Fletcher (Alex Walkinshaw). Walkinshaw had previously appeared in Casualty between 2012 and 2014. Mealing, Stevenson, Everitt and Tonicha Lawrence, who plays patient Stephanie Sims, appeared in the episode of Holby City that followed the feature-length special, "Protect and Serve". Kent promised "several" more crossovers between the two shows following this. Marcel also appeared in episode 3, alongside John Michie, who plays consultant neurosurgeon Guy Self on Holby City. Michie previously appeared in Casualty in 2014 when his character was the hospital's CEO. Hugh Quarshie guest appeared as acting CEO Ric Griffin in episodes 17 and 18. Chizzy Akudolu confirmed that she would make a guest appearance in the series, portraying her Holby City character, consultant cardiothoracic surgeon Mo Effanga. The character appeared in episode 30. Lee Mead filmed a guest appearance as staff nurse Lofty Chiltern, a former Casualty character and current Holby City character, which was broadcast in episode 38.

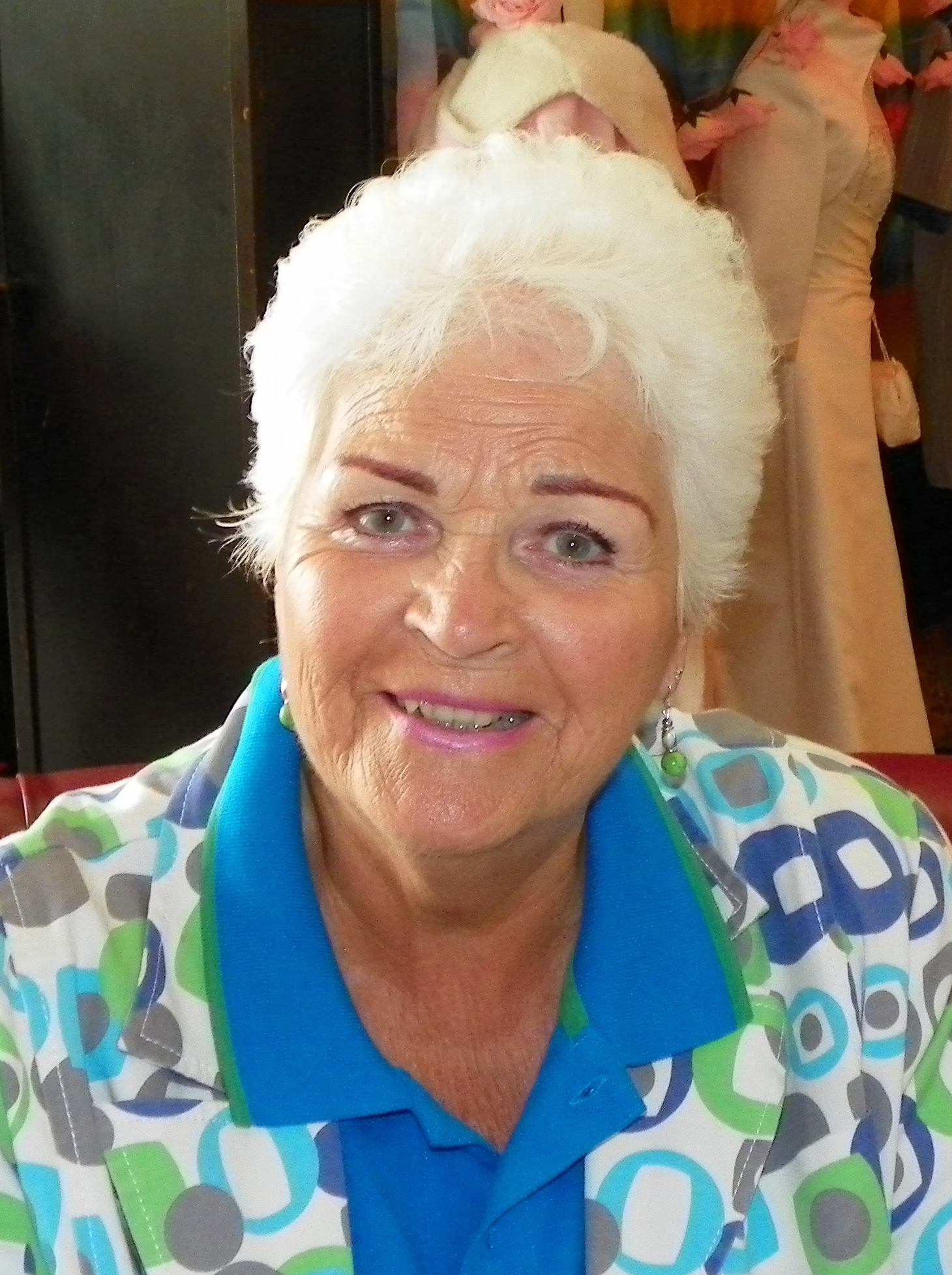
Pam St. Clement guest starred in this series as Sally Hodge.

On 31 August 2016, it was confirmed that Rik Makarem had joined the cast as Sebastian Grayling. Makarem made his first on-screen appearance in episode 10, on 29 October 2016. Makarem left the series after appearing in eight episodes, making his departure in episode 17, broadcast on 7 January 2017. Sebastian's father, Archie Grayling, a consultant surgeon, was introduced for the storyline. James Wilby was cast in the role of Archie and also left in episode 17. Iain's sister, Gemma Dean (Rebecca Ryan), joined the series in episode 19, and departed in episode 33.

The series featured several recurring characters, and numerous guest stars. Lawrence continued her role as Stephanie Sims into the feature-length episode. The show's winter 2016 trailer confirmed Lawrence had reprised her role, and Steph made another appearance in episode 23. Accredited actress Pam St. Clement was cast as "surly" patient Sally Hodge who appeared in the feature-length episode. St. Clement's return to the role was announced on 12 December 2016, and Hossington confirmed that she would return for a guest appearance in March; St. Clement appeared in episode 26. Poppy Jhakra was also cast as agency nurse Amira Zafar for the feature-length episode. Jhakra reprised the role for an appearance in episode 22. David's family was introduced in episode 5, with the appearance of his son and former wife, Oliver Hide (Harry Collett) and Rosa Hide (Lorraine Pilkington). Collett reprised the role in episodes 17, 18 and 25. Hossington revealed in February 2017 that the show would reintroduce a family who guest appeared in the previous series. On 16 March 2017, it was announced that Roy Ellisson (John Killoran) and Denise Ellisson (Lucy Benjamin) would be reintroduced in April, alongside their sons Scott Ellisson (Will Austin) and Mickey Ellisson (Mitch Hewer). Harper said that there would be "explosive consequences" following the family's arrival. Killoran appeared in two episodes, before his character was killed off, whereas the rest of the family began making recurring appearances. Episode 43 marked the death of Austin's character.

The cast of series 31 saw many returning and guest characters, to complement the main series cast: (Note: Guest characters include crossover characters, former characters who guest appear and characters appearing in multiple episodes in a guest capacity.)

=== Main characters ===
- William Beck as Dylan Keogh
- Jamie Davis as Max Walker
- Jason Durr as David Hide
- Lloyd Everitt as Jez Andrews
- Jaye Griffiths as Elle Gardner
- Chelsea Halfpenny as Alicia Munroe
- Amanda Henderson as Robyn Miller
- Tony Marshall as Noel Garcia
- Amanda Mealing as Connie Beauchamp
- Azuka Oforka as Louise Tyler
- George Rainsford as Ethan Hardy
- Cathy Shipton as Lisa "Duffy" Duffin (from episode 1)
- Michael Stevenson as Iain Dean
- Derek Thompson as Charlie Fairhead
- Charles Venn as Jacob Masters
- Richard Winsor as Caleb Knight (until episode 34)
- Crystal Yu as Lily Chao

=== Recurring characters ===
- Billy Angel as Hugo Bonning
- Owain Arthur as Glen Thomas (until episode 9)
- Will Austin as Scott Ellisson
- Lucy Benjamin as Denise Ellisson
- Emily Carey as Grace Beauchamp-Strachan
- Tom Chambers as Sam Strachan
- Harry Collett as Oliver Hide
- Guy Henry as Henrik Hanssen
- Mitch Hewer as Mickey Ellisson
- Rik Makarem as Sebastian Grayling (episodes 11−18)
- Rebecca Ryan as Gemma Dean (episodes 20−34)

=== Guest characters ===
- Chizzy Akudolu as Mo Effanga
- Ian Bleasdale as Josh Griffiths (episodes 1−2, 22, 37)
- Russell Boulter as Ryan Johnson (episodes 15−16)
- Charles Dale as Mackenzie "Big Mac" Chalker (episodes 1−2)
- James Gaddas as Howard Munroe
- Sam Grey as Alice Chantrey (episodes 1−2)
- Ariel Ivo Reid as Tara Jewkes
- Poppy Jhakra as Amira Zafar
- John Killoran as Roy Ellisson
- Martina Laird as Comfort Jones (episodes 1−2)
- Tonicha Lawrence as Steph Sims
- Clive Mantle as Mike Barratt (episodes 1−2)
- Rosie Marcel as Jac Naylor
- Lee Mead as Ben "Lofty" Chiltern (episode 39)
- John Michie as Guy Self
- Steven Miller as Lenny Lyons (episodes 1−2)
- Amy Noble as PC Kate Wilkinson
- Hugh Quarshie as Ric Griffin
- Suzanne Packer as Tess Bateman (episodes 1−2)
- James Redmond as John "Abs" Denham (episodes 1−2)
- Pam St. Clement as Sally Hodge
- Ben Turner as Jay Faldren (episodes 1−2)
- Alex Walkinshaw as Adrian Fletcher (episodes 1−2)
- James Wilby as Archie Grayling
- Tracey Wilkinson as Jackie Munroe

== Episodes ==
No. overall	No. in series	Title	Directed by	Written by	Original release date	UK viewers (millions)
1005–1006	1	"Too Old for This Shift"	Steve Hughes	Matthew Barry & Andy Bayliss	27 August 2016	7.20
Jacob worries for Connie and Grace's safety when he learns that Steph has been admitted, following a road traffic accident. He goes out with Iain and Jez, where they find Connie's crashed car and work to bring her and Grace back to hospital. Meanwhile, Charlie is celebrating his 30th anniversary of working at Holby's emergency department (ED) when news of the accident comes through. As the staff return to do what they can, the whole department is thrown into chaos when the air ambulance transporting Grace is struck by a drone and crash lands outside the hospital. Ethan and Alicia are trapped beneath some collapsed scaffolding. The ED is closed down, with Connie and Grace's care taking priority. A grief-stricken Jacob seeks someone to blame, forcing Charlie to stand up to him and support the staff through the incident.
1007	2	"Fall on Me"	Seán Gleeson	Mark Stevenson	3 September 2016	6.45
Elle is appointed the status of acting clinical lead in Connie's absence. Duffy discovers that Louise may not be handling well since the incident when a flipped car brings a driver and his heavily pregnant wife, Carly, into the ED, the latter of whom says she can hear high-pitched noises, which caused her to jump from the vehicle. Carly attempts to perform a caesarean on herself in the toilets, which leads Duffy to successfully deliver her baby. Dylan confirms Louise's suspicions that the woman has Minor's syndrome. Alicia's mother is admitted with severe abdominal pains, which soon turn out to be the result of gonnorhea. As Alicia confronts her mother over her sexual relationships, she soon learns that her father is to blame. Robyn is heartbroken when biopsy results reveal that Glen has two years to live.
1008	3	"Strike Three"	Seán Gleeson	Claire Miller	10 September 2016	5.34
Jac and Guy are called down to the ED to perform an emergency operation on Grace when they learn she has a pseudoaneurysm. A protective Connie is reluctant to allow Grace to be operated on; she later realises that Grace may have further complications if she does not consent to Grace's operation, prompting Connie to allow the operation to go ahead. Grace survives the operation, much to Sam and Connie's relief. Iain accidentally injures a patient's wife by hitting her with the ambulance door. Jez notices that Iain is not concentrating properly and prompts Lily to check him over. Lily informs Iain that he has a perforated eardrum, so he takes time off of work. Robyn also takes time off of work to go on holiday with Glen, determined to make the most of the time she has left with him.
1009	4	"Pride Comes Before a Fall"	Rick Platt	Suzanne Cowie	17 September 2016	5.57
Ethan and Alicia are sent to the woodlands to rescue Professor Gaynor Lockford and her son when they fall through a sink hole and into a cave. Whilst the pair are lowered into the cave, Alicia is affected by her claustrophobia. Ethan reassures Alicia throughout the rescue operation, and when they return to the hospital, Alicia invites Ethan to the pub for a drink. Louise wants to improve the conditions of the relatives room, so she heads to the Trust board with her idea. When the board reject Louise's proposition, Noel decides to get involved; the two work together to improve the relatives room themselves. Connie is discharged from the hospital, but she refuses to leave an unconscious Grace's bedside. Charlie receives an invitation to an old school reunion; he asks Duffy to attend as his plus-one.
1010	5	"Schoolboy Crush"	Rick Platt	Kayleigh Llewellyn	24 September 2016	5.64
David is delighted, albeit shocked when Ollie, his son, arrives at the ED unexpectedly. However, David's delight is short-lived when his former wife Rosa arrives at the hospital and reveals to his colleagues that David once kidnapped Ollie. Rosa sends Ollie to the car, which unbeknownst to Ollie is leaking fuel. Ollie burns photos of him and David; the embers set the car alight. David rescues Ollie from the burning vehicle, but as he continues to argue with Rosa, Ollie runs to the roof of the hospital. David finds Ollie and he reveals that he is bipolar. Charlie and Duffy attend the school reunion. A fight ensues between Charlie and one of his former bullies, which results in the bully suffering a dislocated shoulder.
1011	6	"Party Pooper"	Diarmuid Goggins	Rachel Aird	1 October 2016	5.78
Ethan struggles to make Alicia's birthday memorable. He plans a party at the pub with their colleagues. Alicia is still bitter with Lily after she bullied her, so falsely tells her that her party is fancy dress. Lily feels humiliated when she arrives at the party and everyone laughs at her. Iain supports Lily following her humiliation. Professor Lockford is readmitted to the ED after falling through a glass pane. When Professor Lockford begins to forget where she is and who her family are, Ethan suspects she has early onset dementia. His suspicions are later confirmed. Lily treats a stripper but struggles to connect with her patient when she is rude to her father. At the party, Ethan arrives late. He is shocked when he witnesses Alicia and Cal kissing.
1012	7	"Too Much Love Will Kill You"	Diarmuid Goggins	Tony Higgins	8 October 2016	5.56
Robyn plans to propose to Glen, but when he ignores her texts and calls, she begins to worry. Glen learns that his brain tumour has grown, and he now has only months left to live, not years. Glen goes to see Robyn, but on his way he has a seizure and hits his head. David and Dylan find Glen and treat him. Robyn is made aware of Glen's condition and supports him. David finds an engagement ring by Glen's bedside and realises Glen is planning to propose too. Glen is taken up in the lift to be operated on, but the lift breaks down. Glen almost dies; Robyn suggests a risky procedure to Dylan, which Dylan performs successfully, saving Glen. The pair propose to each other and agree to marry. Alicia attempts to apologise to Lily for humiliating her. Elle and Jacob treat a patient who believes she is fat as a result of her dead morbidly obese mother.
1013	8	"The Big Day"	Julie Edwards	Tom Higgins & Mark Catley	15 October 2016	5.65
Robyn and Glen's wedding day arrives and the pair agree to get married at the hospital. During her shift, Robyn faints. Dylan checks Robyn over and completes some tests – he learns she is pregnant. When Robyn is assailed by a mentally unstable teenager, Dylan reveals that Robyn is pregnant in an attempt to discourage the teenager from hurting Robyn. Robyn is delighted upon hearing she is pregnant, and looks forward to telling Glen. She goes to the altar and waits for Glen, but is left devastated when David walks down the aisle with a note from Glen, who has written an apology letter for Robyn, explaining that he cannot marry her, and has left her. Connie returns to work, but makes a dangerous mistake whilst recording allergy information on a patient's files, which causes Elle to question Connie's capabilities.
1014	9	"Night of the Loving Dead"	Amanda Mealing	Jeff Povey	22 October 2016	5.72
Robyn attempts to contact Glen following his abrupt departure on their wedding day. When a patient entangled in barbed wire is admitted with Glen's phone, Robyn interrogates the patient, but has no luck in learning of Glen's whereabouts. Robyn soon gives up her search for Glen when she finally realises he does not want anything more to do with her. Robyn considers an abortion, but she begins suffering stomach cramps during her shift, and fears she is having a miscarriage. Dylan does a Doppler scan on Robyn and finds that the baby is alive. Ethan is given two tickets to a hospital awards night. Despite the opportunity to take Alicia with him, Ethan hands the tickets over to Cal, who takes Alicia instead.
1015	10	"Shock to the System"	Tracey Larcombe	Jon Sen	29 October 2016	5.76
Dylan is distraught when Dervla, his dog, goes missing. New F1 doctor Seb Grayling arrives at the ED for his first shift, but he runs Dervla over with his bicycle. Instead of telling anyone, Seb keeps the accident a secret, however, he is quickly caught out by Noel and Dylan when they search through CCTV footage to try and find Dervla. Dylan is unimpressed, and Elle terminates Seb's shift when he fails to follow an elderly burns patient's wishes of a DNAR. Seb is later given a second chance when Elle and Dylan find him helping Dervla. Alicia is unhappy with Cal and how he treats women. Cal asks Alicia out on a second date, but she rejects Cal, telling him he needs to change his attitude towards women before she will date him. By the end of the day, Alicia finds herself in Cal's bed.
1016	11	"Thirty Years"	Paul Riordan	Kelly Jones	5 November 2016	5.79
Duffy's heavily pregnant daughter-in-law, Tanya, arrives at the ED just before going into labour. Soon after going into labour, Tanya asks to be admitted to another hospital when her estranged mother turns up unexpectedly searching for her. Duffy learns that Tanya's mother neglected her when she was younger, and that Tanya blames her for the family returning to the UK from New Zealand. As Tanya prepares to leave in the ambulance, her mother grabs the ambulance keys and drops them down a drain, resulting in Tanya giving birth in the back of the ambulance. Duffy confides in Charlie and the pair share a kiss. Seb and Dylan treat a patient with epilepsy. Dylan learns that Seb's father is Archie, who is one of the top consultants at the hospital. Dylan clashes with Seb when Archie tries to take a patient for surgery without the patient's consent.
1017	12	"About My Mother"	Paul Riordan	Kim Millar	19 November 2016	5.89
Connie distracts herself from Grace as the day of her discharge from hospital arrives. Hugo, a school friend of Grace's, is admitted to the ED when he falls from the underside of a lorry whilst hitchhiking. Connie treats Hugo, but soon becomes distressed when Hugo begins questioning Connie on Grace's whereabouts. Connie lies to Hugo about Grace; he later finds out and flees the hospital when he also learns that his father's girlfriend is pregnant. Just as Hugo leaves the hospital, Connie learns he has a liver injury. She tracks him down and convinces him to return to the hospital for treatment, as well as to see Grace. Elle announces to the staff an undercover inspector will be present in the hospital for the day. Just as the inspector prepares to leave with a satisfying review, he hears that Louise verbally abused a patient and David and Seb dismissed a potential diagnosis.
1018	13	"Not in Holby Anymore"	Matthew Evans	Simon Norman	26 November 2016	5.80
Charlie, Duffy and Jacob challenge the team following a disappointing review, picking out their colleagues weaknesses and setting tasks for the team to complete throughout their shift. David is sent out with the paramedics, where he finds himself jumping from a building and onto a car to save a man suffering severe crush injuries following a crowd crush at a nightclub. Louise works on her compassion, but struggles to connect with a patient who is high on drugs and has undiagnosed mental health issues. Noel becomes irritated by the introduction of new self sign-in machines at the reception desk. As the trios shift ends, David, Louise and Noel overhear Charlie, Duffy and Jacob having a private conversation, and soon learn the tasks they completed were only implemented to help them build on their confidence and communication skills.
1019	14	"All I Want for Christmas Is You"	Matthew Evans	Rebecca Wojciechowski	3 December 2016	5.75
Connie returns to work following Grace's discharge. Her first patient is one she treated when she was a cardiothoracic surgeon, Peter. Peter is admitted with an end-of-life care plan, but his father begs Connie to keep him alive. As Peter's organs begin to fail, Connie manages to find a match for Peter's much needed heart-lung transplant. Seb confidently takes charge of a patient whose condition drastically deteriorates following her admission to the ED. When his patient dies, Archie makes a cruel comment to Seb, which leaves Seb blaming himself for his patient's death. Seb goes to the Christmas party and gets drunk. He then heads to Dylan's boathouse and tries to kiss Dylan; he is shocked when Dylan rejects him. Robyn reveals her pregnancy news to the team at the Christmas party – except for Max – who is still unaware his half-sister is pregnant. Duffy and Charlie declare their love for each other, but as they do, Duffy's estranged husband, Ryan, turns up.
1020	15	"Bah Humbug"	David Beauchamp	Dominique Moloney	10 December 2016	5.73
Seb avoids Dylan following his drunken attempt to kiss him and treats a patient involved in a Christmas sales riot, but his clinical abilities are once again brought into question by Dylan when he discovers that Seb has missed a build-up of fluid in his patient's abdomen. Seb is annoyed by Dylan and tells Elle that Dylan tried to kiss him. With Ryan back, Duffy is forced to choose between her relationship with Charlie and her relationship with her family. Ryan is caught up in the Christmas riots and admitted to the ED. He begins faking symptoms similar to a brain tumour. Duffy soon catches Ryan out, and realises she is happy with Charlie. Duffy hands the divorce papers over to Ryan, before proposing to Charlie, who agrees to marry her.
1021	16	"New Me, New Year, New You"	David Beauchamp	Sarah Beeson	31 December 2016	5.26
Seb asks Elle if she will mentor him following the allegations he made against Dylan. Elle tells Seb he could ruin Dylan's career if he chooses to pursue his complaint, and suggests the pair resolve their issues among themselves. Seb works with Dylan on a patient with hypothermia. Seb begins to feel intimidated by Dylan, and when Louise asks him if he is okay, Seb also tells Louise that Dylan tried to kiss him. Dylan learns of Seb's rumour and attempts to defend himself, but feels humiliated when his colleagues do not believe him. Seb files a formal complaint against Dylan. Connie begins to convince herself there is a medical error in Grace's hospital care notes, and asks Noel for her medical file. Elle asks Ethan and Cal to consider applying for a research project in South Africa. Ethan composes his project proposal, but Cal steals it, infuriating Ethan. Ethan vents his anger out to Alicia before declaring his love for her; the pair share another kiss.
1022	17	"What Lurks in the Heart"	Jamie Annett	Rachel Smith	7 January 2017	5.97
Seb continues to spread his rumour. Max and Jez visit Dylan on his boathouse; it is a mess. The pair encourage Dylan to go to work, but once he arrives Elle makes it clear to Dylan that she should be suspending him pending further investigation – Dylan ignores Elle and treats a patient with down syndrome. Dylan is called to a HR meeting to discuss the events between him and Seb, but he misses his meeting when Seb's patient requires an emergency operation. Following the operation success, Seb tells Dylan he will tell Elle that he has been lying. Archie finds out about Seb's rumour and is unimpressed, but Dylan stands up for Seb and recommends him a placement at St. James's hospital. Cal returns from his weekend in London. He is unaware that Alicia and Ethan have started a relationship, and he grows suspicious after finding a cufflink on his bedroom floor.
1023	18	"Back to School"	Jamie Annett	Laura Poliakoff	14 January 2017	5.93
Elle begins to feel the pressure from Connie, Ric and the Holby City Trust as Connie's complaint brings the board together to discuss Elle's clinical action on Grace. Trying to take her mind off of the situation, Elle treats a patient admitted after a lighting rig collapses at a nightclub. However, Elle finds herself questioning her clinical competence when she misses a crucial head injury on the patient, leaving them brain damaged. David is reluctant to attend Ollie's school play. When Ollie's teacher is admitted with signs of Klinefelter syndrome, he prompts David to attend his son's play. After the school play, David admits to Robyn his bipolar disorder is affecting him and he is not feeling any emotions. When Jacob stands up for Elle, Connie decides their relationship cannot continue, and she leaves him.
1024	19	"Little Sister"	Fiona Walton	Joseph Wilde & Jeff Povey	21 January 2017	5.98
Iain's younger sister, Gemma, arrives at the ambulance station with rib injuries. Iain sends Gemma to the ED to be checked over by Lily, who notices injuries on Gemma consistent with abuse. In the cubicle next to Gemma is social worker Belle, who has been admitted after being hit over the head with a wok. Iain and Lily are unaware that Gemma hit Belle with the wok, but when Lily realises that Belle's rings match the bruising on Gemma, Lily confronts Belle, who reveals Gemma assaulted her with the wok, and threatens to have her sentence lengthened if anyone says anything. Lily informs Iain of the situation Gemma is in; Iain is unimpressed and walks off. Connie's grudge against Elle grows, and when a patient under Connie's care is discharged by Elle and later readmitted after choking on his dentures, Connie encourages the patient to make a formal complaint.
1025	20	"Crazy Little Thing Called Love"	Fiona Walton	Mark Stevenson	28 January 2017	5.61
Alicia attends her parents anniversary party when she learns they are giving their relationship another go. However, when her father Howard's secret lover, Martin, turns up at the party unexpectedly, Howard tries to get Martin to leave, which results in him being crushed against a skip. Once in the ED, Cal notices Martin declaring his love to Howard, and exposes their infidelity to Alicia and Jackie. Jackie is devastated to learn the truth, while Alicia tells Cal their relationship is over, although she soon finds herself apologising and the pair get back together. Noel is interviewed by the Trust Board when they consider firing all receptionists, but when Louise helps Noel save a young boy's life in the hospital toilets, she inspires the interviewers to not fire Noel. Charlie's stag night begins, and Cal makes a realisation when he pulls the cufflink found on his and Alicia's bedroom floor from his pocket, only for Ethan to reclaim it as his.
1026	21	"The Stag, the Dog and the Sheep"	Seán Gleeson	Jeff Povey	4 February 2017	5.99
Charlie's stag do does not go to plan when, on the morning after the party, Ethan wakes up with a sheep in his room and Cal, Josh and Noel wake up in a bed together. Cal has a briefcase handcuffed to his hand which is full of money; he and Ethan work together to quickly get rid of the briefcase before they get themselves into trouble. The team soon realise that Dylan and Charlie have both gone missing, and so they begin a search party. Duffy fears that Charlie has left her when he ignores her phone calls. Charlie and Dylan are soon found, and the men all return to the ED, where Charlie and Duffy marry. Connie treats a patient who is injured after being fired from a cannon.
1027	22	"You Are Your Only Limit"	Seán Gleeson	Dana Fainaru	11 February 2017	5.72
Elle's hearing comes around and Connie is determined to get Elle fired. Connie takes Grace to the court room and attempts to pretend that she is still critically ill, in hopes that the judges feel sorry for her. Jacob and Sam learn of Connie's cruel plan, and are unimpressed. At the hearing, Grace finds the court room too stressful and is removed by Sam. She goes to the toilets and smashes a mirror, before collapsing and fitting. Elle finds Grace and rushes to her aid, saving her life. Connie is grateful to Elle and retracts her statement, enabling Elle to keep her job. Despite this, Connie is still seeking someone to blame for Grace's injuries, and turns her attention to Steph – ringing the prison and requesting a visit. At the ED, David hands Robyn a plastic doll to provide her practice parenting. Robyn struggles with the reality of motherhood, but soon learns there were bets going around seeing how long she could last with the doll.
1028	23	"Binge Britain"	Paul Riordan	Laura Poliakoff	18 February 2017	5.99
Iain is disappointed when Gemma fails to show up to her visiting order. Once she is released, Gemma visits Kim, her and Iain's mother, in her second floor flat. Gemma steals a necklace but Kim realises the necklace has gone missing. Before Gemma is kicked out, two men approach the flat and attack Kim, before throwing her over a stairwell. Gemma and Kim are admitted to the ED and Iain queries Gemma, who walks off. Gemma later finds herself caught up in a hostage situation, leaving Iain to save her. When they both return to the hospital, the pair are informed that their mother is dying. Iain tells Gemma that she can temporarily live with him until she finds a flat of her own. Dylan investigates booze buses as the ED struggles to accommodate increasing numbers of drunken patients who are being admitted every evening.
1029	24	"Slipping Under"	Paul Riordan	Jason Sutton	25 February 2017	5.88
Connie visits Steph in prison asks her to plea guilty in court. Just hours later, Steph is admitted to the ED after overdosing. Many of the hospital staff refuse to treat Steph, except Charlie, who helps Steph realise that suicide is not the way out of her problems. As Connie continues to taunt Steph, Sam reminds Connie that her actions could ultimately result in Steph not going to prison, and instead walking free. Grace refuses to talk to anyone, so Sam asks for her to be checked over by a psychologist. The psychologist informs Sam and Connie that Grace's silence is not psychological: Grace is simply choosing to not talk to anyone. Sam gives Grace an iPad; she writes on the iPad that everything is Connie's fault. Gemma steals from Iain but is caught out. Iain is unimpressed and tells Gemma she needs to get a job. An opportunity quickly arises at the ED café, and Gemma is offered a job as a barista.
1030	25	"It Starts with the Shoes"	Jo Johnson	Kim Millar	4 March 2017	5.29
David spends time with Oliver in the ED after learning his son is being flown over to Spain at the end of the day to live with Rosa and his aunt. A mother and daughter are admitted after a domestic accident; the mother is diagnosed with schizophrenia. David uses his intuition to help the mother when her daughter overdoses on internet bought medication. After his shift, David waves Oliver off on his way to the airport. David considers taking his bipolar medication, but later decides it is preventing him from being who he wants to be, so he flushes his medication down the toilet. Gemma starts her first shift as a barista, but her inability to read and distribute change irritates her. Louise works alongside Dylan to encourage the hospital's Trust board to invest in a booze bus.
1031	26	"The Good Samaritan"	Jo Johnson	Mark Catley	11 March 2017	5.43
David arrives at work in a purple suit and brand new car which he impulsively bought on his way to the ED. When former patient Sally Hodge crashes her car into road bollards, charitable man Arnie attempts to move her car, but suffers severe burns when the car ignites. Once in the ED, David is tasked with keeping Arnie calm, but his forceful and ill-suited attempt to calm the situation results in Dylan and Jacob removing David from Resus. David later returns to Resus in disguise, and tells Arnie he may be dying; he is removed by security. Dylan goes to visit the counsellor David claims he is seeing, only to make the realisation that she does not exist. Robyn attempts to help David by going on a car journey with him, unaware that David is erratic and unstable, putting herself and her baby in danger.
1032	27	"Mobile"	Alex Jacob	Mark Catley	18 March 2017	5.52
David takes Robyn on a drive. Dylan phones Robyn and informs her that David's bipolar disorder is affecting his mental state. Robyn prepares to message Dylan their location, but David throws Robyn's phone from the car before she can send the message. The pair arrive at a graveyard, where David reveals his brother was depressed and committed suicide. Robyn attempts to help David, but goes into labour, forcing David to deliver her baby. Robyn successfully gives birth, but falls unconscious from the loss of blood. They are eventually found and returned to the hospital, where David is sectioned. Lily treats a young girl who has withdrawal symptoms. She soon learns that the young girl has nomophobia. Louise and Jez share a kiss.
1033	28	"Five Days"	Julie Edwards	Barbara Machin	25 March 2017	5.65
Following the birth of her daughter, Charlotte, Robyn creates a video diary to record her first five days. She is optimistic and excited to meet Charlotte, but fails to realise how ill her prematurely born daughter is. She soon realises her health is deteriorating and she may need operating on. She goes to take her anger out on David, but learns he has been sectioned and sedated. Charlie and Duffy console Robyn. Charlotte is operated on and Robyn breaks down after realising that her daughter may not survive. However, Charlotte survives the operation and begins her recovery as Robyn holds her daughter. Cal treats an end-stage cancer patient who dies in Resus. The patient's daughter, Niamh, files a complaint against Cal and later arrives in the ED, drunk, with a dislocated shoulder. Cal treats her and sends her home, but he soon finds her overdosed. After treating Niamh, Cal has the complaint dropped.
1034	29	"Sleeping with the Enemy"	Simon Massey	Steve Bailie	1 April 2017	5.45
Alicia wakes up hungover in Sam's bed. She makes her way to the ED where Sam is holding a meeting in the staff room. As a result of budget cuts on the NHS, all consultants must be re-interviewed to secure their jobs at Holby City. Connie, Dylan, Elle, Cal, Ethan and Alicia all fear for their jobs. Ethan is disappointed when he learns that Alicia had sex with Sam. Gemma is given the opportunity by Iain to spend the day on the ambulance with him and Jez. The trio attend a call-out to a young lady who has been run over by her mother. When Gemma removes the car from on top of the patient, Iain is furious with her. Jez helps Iain realise that Gemma only did what she thought was best, and helped the situation.
1035	30	"Child of Mine"	Simon Massey	Jessica Ruston	8 April 2017	5.57
Connie receives a phone call from Hugo, Grace's friend, who hastily hangs up. Hugo's father's girlfriend, Keira, finds Hugo in the house. Hugo runs away, and Keira follows him. Hugo runs into a barn and climbs a ladder as Keira follows him – both are electrocuted by exposed wiring in the barn and admitted to the ED. Connie treats Hugo and learns that Keira has been taking abortion pills whilst 25-weeks pregnant. It is Grace's birthday and Sam is delighted by Grace's reaction to his presents; Connie gives Grace her presents but Grace rejects them. She tells Connie that she hates her, before having a seizure. Sam recommends that Grace moves in with him. David returns to work following his mental breakdown and works with Dylan to treat recurring alcoholic Molly Drover. Louise informs Jez she has booked them a posh restaurant for the evening. Jez realises he does not want to go, but struggles to tell Louise.
1036	31	"When the Whistle Blows"	Tracey Larcombe	John Yorke	15 April 2017	4.73
Sam tells the consultants at the ED that they will not be able to work overtime any more, in an attempt to ease financial pressure on the department. He also informs Cal that his surgical rotation will no longer be continued. Cal is furious by Sam's actions and declares a strike in protest of his decision. Lily finds herself in a predicament, disagreeing with Cal's protest, but also disagreeing with Sam's decisions. Alicia is devastated when she has naked photos with her face photoshopped onto them leaked on the internet, and wonders whether Sam is responsible. Jez has sex with Elle's son, Kalen, not realising that Kalen is her son. When Elle discovers that Jez has had sex with her son she is furious, and confronts Jez in front of the whole ED. She later realises her actions were unacceptable and apologises.
1037	32	"Reap the Whirlwind – Part One"	Steve Brett	Jon Sen	22 April 2017	4.98
Cal's strike begins. The junior doctors and consultants gather outside the ED. The well-known racist and homophobic Ellisson family: Roy, Mickey and Scott, are admitted to the hospital after they are involved in a violent fight outside a pub. Jez learns that Mickey is gay and encourages him to tell his father. Roy is enraged to learn his son is gay, and goes into cardiac arrest. With a lack of staff, Sam is forced to step in and try and save Roy's life alongside Ethan and Lily. Lily stands by Sam during the strike, until he asks her to move her terminally ill patient to the corridors to make way for more patients. Iain learns that Gemma was responsible for sharing naked photoshopped photos of Alicia. Gemma phones Lily and asks her to meet her in an underground car park, but Gemma has been drinking, and as Lily arrives at the car park, Gemma accidentally hits her with the car, leaving Lily unconscious on the floor.
1038	33	"Reap the Whirlwind – Part Two"	Steve Brett	Dominique Moloney	29 April 2017	5.37
Lily lies unconscious on the floor of the car park. A frightened Gemma flees the scene of the incident, and phones Iain to tell him what has happened. Iain and Jez rush to the car park and Lily is admitted to the ED. With help from Iain, Gemma hands herself in to the police. The protest outside is quickly cut short when the staff learn of Lily's condition. As the staff pull together to treat Lily, Ethan helps Sam attempt to save Roy's life, but they are unsuccessful, and Roy is pronounced dead. Ethan informs the Ellisson family of Roy's death; they blame Ethan for his death, and Scott promises to get revenge. Cal quickly learns that Scott is searching for Ethan, and gets involved. Scott and Cal fight outside the hospital; Scott pulls a knife from his pocket and stabs Cal. He leaves Cal to die. Dylan finds Cal slumped outside the ED and rushes him into Resus, but he is too late, and Cal dies, surrounded by his colleagues.
1039	34	"Break Point"	David Innes Edwards	Simon Norman	6 May 2017	5.38
Ethan prepares for his shift, despite dissuasion from the staff at the hospital. He treats a lifeguard who has been admitted after being run over outside a swimming pool. Ethan learns the driver's daughter drowned and the driver ran the lifeguard down as he felt he was culpable for his daughter's death; this helps Ethan see grief in a different way. Ethan finds a voicemail notification from Cal on his phone − he listens to the voicemail, and learns that Scott was planning to kill him instead of Cal. Ethan hands the phone to the police and grieves for Cal with Alicia, as the pair look to the future together. Louise realises that Jez has growing feelings for Mickey, and fears that if Jez embarks on a relationship with Mickey, it will not look good on him. Hugo visits Connie at the ED and begins calling her his mum.
1040	35	"End of the Road"	Lynsey Miller	Joe Williams & Kelly Jones	20 May 2017	5.21
Connie in enjoying spending time with Hugo, until she learns that Hugo's father is intending to move him to Scotland. Connie is upset by the news, and tells Hugo it is time for him to leave. Hugo is heartbroken by the news and runs away, leaving Connie and his father frantically searching for him. When PC Paterson is admitted to the ED after suffering heart pains, he agrees to join in on the search for Hugo. Connie and PC Paterson find Hugo, but then PC Paterson goes into cardiac arrest. Connie and Hugo work together to save PC Paterson's life. Afterwards, Connie helps Hugo understand that he is better off living with his father. Hugo leaves for Scotland, and when Connie gets home from her shift, she breaks down. Jez questions Mickey's motives when he runs off after they spend the night together. He later learns Mickey is being cautious. Lily returns to work but misses vital signs on a patient.
1041	36	"Roadman"	Alex Jacob	Mark Catley	3 June 2017	4.88
Elle visits son Blake's school alongside Josh and Jacob to give a careers talk assembly to the students. As the trio arrive, they find themselves treating a schoolgirl who is being bullied. Josh looks after the schoolgirl while Elle and Jacob give their talks to the students. After the talk, Elle learns that Blake has been getting involved with a violent gang. She tells Blake to distance himself from the gang, but the gang leader walks up to Blake and strikes him across the face with a knuckleduster. Blake hits his head hard on the floor as is rushed to the ED. Alicia performs an emergency procedure on Blake to save his eyesight; he then goes for emergency surgery. Louise and Alicia learn that Cal was planning on setting up a refugee charity, so the pair decide to lead the charity in Cal's honour.
1042	37	"Swift Vengeance Waits"	Judith Dine	Rachel Smith	10 June 2017	5.17
Ethan clears out Cal's locker as he begins to get his life back on track, but when Scott, Mickey and Denise Ellisson are admitted to the ED after suffering injuries whilst attending a racist rally, Ethan sees the opportunity to get a confession out of Scott over Cal's murder. Ethan is unsuccessful in retrieving any information from Scott, and he ends up fighting Scott in the hospital. Mickey's condition begins to deteriorate and Ethan uses Mickey's condition to once again try and get Scott to confess to Cal's murder, but he is still unsuccessful. As Mickey's condition stabilises and Scott goes prepares to go home, he winds Ethan up, telling him that he hopes the police find whoever killed Cal. Jez struggles accept Mickey's divided loyalties between him and his racist family.
1043	38	"Do Not Stand at My Grave and Weep"	Judith Dine	Dana Fainaru	17 June 2017	5.04
Ethan braces himself as the day of Cal's funeral arrives. He treats a schoolboy admitted after a coach crash and helps the boy and his father come to terms with the death of their mother. Ethan later learns the schoolboy does not know he was born with HIV and, against the boy's father's wishes, tells his patient the truth. At the end of his shift, Ethan gets drunk and, alongside most of the staff, attends Cal's funeral. Ethan gives a heartfelt eulogy and mourns for Cal. After the funeral, Ethan pays his respects at Cal's grave, but he catches Scott hiding by the church and chases him. Dylan treats a schoolgirl also admitted following the coach crash and attempts to make the patient's mother realise that alternative medicine is not an ideal option to help treat her daughter. At the ED, members of staff release balloons in memory of Cal.
1044	39	"It Had to Be You"	Graham Sherrington	Matthew Barry & Mark Stevenson	24 June 2017	5.30
Connie, Dylan, Elle and Lily all prepare themselves as the day of the interviews for the consultant post arrives. With Sam interviewing all of his colleagues, an angry Connie sabotages the interviews by calling all the consultants to Resus as a teenager is admitted after being impaled on a metal spike. Sam quickly realises that Connie is trying to sabotage the interviews. Dylan continues to blame himself for the death of Cal, and tells Sam in his job interview that he could not care less about the position. By the end of his shift Sam reaches a decision about the consultancy post – instead of firing a member of staff, he stands down from his role as medical director to become a Trust Grade doctor. Alicia is unnerved upon learning that Ethan is stalking Scott. Lily and Iain's relationship strains when the pair disagree about how to treat an elderly couple who attempt suicide.
1045	40	"War of the Roses"	Graham Sherrington	Rachel Aird	1 July 2017	5.21
Sam's first day as a doctor does not go to plan when he is told he will be treating minor injuries. When an opportunity to go and help the paramedics out at an incident arises, Sam rushes out, without Connie's permission. Upon returning to the ED, Connie is furious to learn Sam has disobeyed orders. Despite this, Connie keeps Sam on the team, as it becomes increasingly evident that there is still a spark between the pair. Dylan has a panic attack while treating a patient who has admitted herself with a self-diagnosed heart attack as he continues to blame himself for Cal's death. David helps Dylan realise that Cal's death was not his fault and that he cannot blame himself, which helps Dylan find his confidence again.
1046	41	"Man Up"	Shaun Evans	Suzanne Cowie	8 July 2017	5.09
Ethan learns that Jez is in a secret relationship with Mickey. He uses his new-found knowledge in an attempt to befriend Mickey and turn him against Scott. Ethan's plan soon backfires when Mickey refuses to help him take Scott down, so Ethan blackmails Mickey, which ultimately results in Ethan losing respect from Jez and Alicia, and Alicia and Ethan breaking up. Sam attempts to take time off work to attend Grace's physiotherapy session, but Connie refuses Sam's requests, and attends Grace's session instead. Sam later finds an opportunity to get back at Connie when a bride is admitted with a rare disease, naegleria fowleri. It requires a special drug needing approval from Connie, which Sam fails to get. Connie learns of Sam's deception and is furious with him.
1047	42	"Somewhere Between Silences − Part One"	Fiona Walton	Paul Matthew Thompson	15 July 2017	5.43
Mickey phones Jez from an abandoned shed after coming off a motorbike. Jez learns that Mickey was involved in a shop raid under Scott's control on a Muslim family, and is devastated by Mickey's deceit. When Scott arrives at the ED in search of Mickey, he finds Mickey with Jez. Mickey and Scott hurl racist insults at Jez. Ethan exposes Jez and Mickey's relationship, aggravating Scott, who sees Jez on the balcony. Scott heads up to balcony and Mickey follows. Scott pulls a knife from his pocket as he goes to stab Jez, but Mickey intervenes, and as the brothers scuffle, Scott is accidentally thrown over the balcony and onto the ED floor. Max sets up a speed date at the pub and attracts the attention from one particular lady, Tara. When Tara is admitted, Max learns that she is transsexual. Despite this, he still asks her on a date.
1048	43	"Somewhere Between Silences − Part Two"	Fiona Walton	Jeff Povey	22 July 2017	5.67
Ethan rushes to Scott's aid as he lies on the floor of the ED with a serious head injury. Scott begs Ethan to help him, and Ethan does. When Scott makes a comment about Cal, Ethan walks away and Lily is put on the case instead. Lily tells Scott he will to be okay. Ethan later visits Scott again and is taunted by him, who explains that Cal deserved to be murdered. But then, Scott begins choking on his vomit. Instead of helping, Ethan watches Scott choke to death, before walking away. Scott is pronounced dead, and an investigation into his death begins. A heartbroken Ethan returns to Cal's grave as he struggles to comprehend events. Connie shows off a recuperated Grace, who no longer requires a wheelchair or crutches. Grace is given the opportunity to live with Connie again, but when Connie prioritises work over Grace, Grace realises that she is best off living with Sam still.
1049	44	"One"	Jon Sen	Paul Unwin	29 July 2017	6.57
Jez and Iain admit a Korean lady after rescuing her from a house fire. Jez is proud of his achievement upon saving the lady from the burning building, but when it is later revealed that her baby died in the house fire, and Jez did not save the baby, he is devastated. Duffy takes charge of two young adults, Diamond and Chloe, who are observing an hour in the ED. Ethan does whatever he can to take his mind off of recent events, with little succession. Louise takes charge of triaging patients and the receptionist role when Noel calls in sick, but her aggression gets the better of her when she is put under immense pressure. A drama unfolds in the staff room when the true cause of the fire, and the arsonist, is revealed to be a close relative of the Korean lady.

== Reception ==
=== Critical response ===
The anniversary episode received strong praise from fans. Radio Times reported that viewers were left "stunned" by the episode, while Digital Spy stated that fans were left in "shock and awe" over the episode. The Daily Mirror reporter Sharon Marshall praised the episode, branding it as a "pitch-perfect episode mixing gore, heartache, drama and nostalgia". Marshall added that the episode "showcased what Casualty does best – beautiful writing and a stellar cast who grab your heartstrings," before concluding her review by praising the episode as being able to make the show "look as fresh and exciting as the day it was born." However, the show also received criticism, with the episode being branded "insensitive" by the Midlands Air Ambulance Charity.

The final episode of the series received a mixed reception. Alison Graham, writing for the Radio Times, described the episode as a "bold piece of television" and praised the show for displaying "the chaos of a front-line service". Jessica Ransom of What's on TV enjoyed the episode and was impressed that there were no mistakes. She said the episode highlighted the "ever chaotic trauma" and a "particularly explosive day" in the emergency department. Michael Hogan of The Daily Telegraph wrote a review on the episode, awarding it a score of 3 out of 5. While he thought that the fly-on-the-wall theme created "intensity and realism" within the episode, he opined that some speeches from the characters "didn't quite work" and found the explanations during the episode "jarring". He praised the decision to have original cast members, Shipton and Thompson, lead the episode, but commented that the episode was "let down by a clunking script that needed some doctoring of its own."

=== Broadcast ratings ===
Ratings for series 31 of Casualty averaged at 5.61 million viewers, an increase on the previous series. The opening episode received an overnight rating of 5.10 million viewers, a 26% share of the total audience. BBC Media Centre later revealed the episode was watched by an audience of 7.20 million viewers. The single-take episode that concluded the series received a 28-day rating of 6.57 million viewers. Episode 1 is the highest-rated episode of the series, while episode 31 is the lowest-rated episode of the series with a rating of 4.73 million viewers.

=== Awards and nominations ===
On 25 January 2017, Casualty was awarded Best Drama at the annual National Television Awards. The show was shortlisted against Cold Feet, Game of Thrones, Happy Valley and The Night Manager. On the win, Shipton commented, "I'm not that surprised we won tonight. I'm a newbie and the strength of the cast and the writing and the passion behind that show is on screen and that's why they voted for us." Hossington called the reaction to the win "electric" and said it had "a huge impact on everybody". She added that the show's team were "so chuffed that the sheer love and hard work that they put into the show has been appreciated by the audience and the fans". The win also received criticism from those who believed that Casualty should be classified as a soap opera and not entered into the category.

It was announced on 11 April 2017 that Casualty had been nominated for a BAFTA award under the Soap & Continuing Drama category. ITV soap opera Emmerdale won the accolade. The helicopter crash, Charlie and Duffy's wedding and Cal's murder were shortlisted for Best Drama Storyline at the 2017 Inside Soap Awards. On 6 November 2017, the helicopter crash won the "Best Drama Storyline" accolade. Casualty was shortlisted in the "Best Soap/Continuing Drama" category at the 2018 Broadcast Awards, but lost out to Channel 4 soap opera Hollyoaks. Judges praised the "truth and sensitivity" involved in Robyn's premature birth storyline and found the use of puppets as Robyn's baby "amazing".
