= Too Old for This Shift =

- Casualty episodes
- A helicopter crashes in the emergency department
- Episode nos.: Series 31; Episodes 1-2
- Directed by: Steve Hughes
- Written by: Matthew Barry and Andy Bayliss
- Original air date: 27 August 2016
- Running time: 99 minutes

Guest appearance
- List: Ian Bleasdale as Josh Griffiths; Raif Clarke as Kai Swift; Charles Dale as Mackenzie "Big Mac" Chalker; Daisy Douglas as Charlotte Swift; Adam Foster as Steve Swift; Sam Grey as Alice Chantrey; Guy Henry as Henrik Hanssen; John Hogg as Harry Price; Poppy Jhakra as Amira Zafa; Martina Laird as Comfort Jones; Tonicha Lawrence as Steph Sims; Clive Mantle as Mike Barratt; Rosie Marcel as Jac Naylor; Steven Miller as Lenny Lyons; Suzanne Packer as Tess Bateman; James Redmond as John "Abs" Denham; Pam St. Clement as Sally Hodge; Ben Turner as Jay Faldren; Alex Walkinshaw as Adrian Fletcher; Holli Hoffman as Debbie Phillips

Episode chronology
← Previous "Sticks and Stones"	Next → "Fall on Me"
- Casualty series 31

"Too Old for This Shift" is a special feature-length episode of the British medical drama television series Casualty. It was broadcast as the premiere episode of its thirty-first series on 27 August 2016, on BBC One, to commemorate the 30th anniversary of the show. The special, which is 99 minutes long, was co-written by Matthew Barry and Andy Bayliss, directed by Steve Hughes, and produced by Lucy Raffety.

"Too Old for This Shift" explores the outcome of the cliffhanger broadcast at the end of the thirtieth series, by focusing on the events surrounding the aftermath of the collision involving established characters Connie Beauchamp (Amanda Mealing) and her daughter Grace Beauchamp (Emily Carey). The episode centres around the celebrations of Charlie Fairhead's (Derek Thompson) thirtieth anniversary of working in the fictitious Holby City Hospital's emergency department, where the show is set. It also features a helicopter crash outside the emergency department, which causes damage to the hospital.

Several actors who have previously appeared on Casualty during its thirty years on air made a cameo appearance during the special, while Ian Bleasdale reprised his role as Josh Griffiths for the entirety of the episode. The episode also marked the return of Cathy Shipton in her role of Lisa "Duffy" Duffin, following her guest appearances in the thirtieth series. The special also featured character crossovers from sister show Holby City, with Jac Naylor (Rosie Marcel), Henrik Hanssen (Guy Henry) and Adrian "Fletch" Fletcher (Alex Walkinshaw) appearing in the episode. The episode was watched by 7.20 million viewers and received mixed reviews. Fans of the show praised the episode and demanded it receive an award. Sharon Marshall of The Daily Mirror enjoyed the episode and believed it "showcased what Casualty does best", while Midlands Air Ambulance Charity branded the episode as "insensitive". On 6 November 2017, the helicopter crash won the "Best Drama Storyline" accolade at the Inside Soap Awards.

== Plot ==
Connie Beauchamp (Amanda Mealing) lies unconscious, having been thrown from her car after it plunged over a ravine. Steph Sims (Tonicha Lawrence) watches down from the top of the cliff before driving off. A few minutes later she calls for an ambulance, but is hit by a car before she can. As Connie regains consciousness, she notices Grace Beauchamp's (Emily Carey) shoe in the car. Flames begin erupting from the vehicle. Connie moves towards the car but before she can get to Grace it explodes.

Meanwhile, the emergency department prepares to celebrate Charlie Fairhead's (Derek Thompson) thirtieth year at Holby City with a surprise party. The surprise is soon spoilt when Charlie finds former paramedic Josh Griffiths (Ian Bleasdale) in cubicles. Charlie then works to treat patient Sally Hodge (Pam St. Clement). Sally is revealed to have lithopedia after miscarrying her baby during her teenage years. Charlie then visits the pub where a party is held in his honour, with video footage from former colleagues shown to him.

Jacob Masters (Charles Venn) becomes concerned for Connie and Grace when they fail to answer their phones; when Steph is admitted to the emergency department, he goes in the ambulance with paramedics Iain Dean (Michael Stevenson) and Jez Andrews (Lloyd Everitt) to the location where she was found. The trio find Connie's burnt out car at the bottom of the cliff. They reach Connie and learn that Grace was inside the vehicle as it exploded, but when Jez searches the vehicle, she is not there. As Iain and Jez search for Grace they find her in a critical condition and call for an air ambulance to escort her to hospital.

As the air ambulance prepares to land outside the emergency department a rotor blade is struck by a drone, causing the helicopter to crash land in the parking lot outside the hospital and into the back of an ambulance, causing the ambulance to knock scaffolding down over Alicia Munroe (Chelsea Halfpenny) and Ethan Hardy (George Rainsford). The tail of the helicopter smashes into the entrance of the emergency department causing brutal injuries. The department is shut down following the incident, with Connie and Grace’s lives prioritised. Grace is freed from the helicopter and taken into the department for treatment. Connie learns Grace has life-threatening injuries and may not survive surgery. The staff at Holby City come together to treat casualties of the accident. Grace survives surgery, but remains in a critical condition.

== Cast ==
- Charlie Fairhead – Derek Thompson
- Connie Beauchamp – Amanda Mealing
- Jacob Masters – Charles Venn
- Elle Gardner − Jaye Griffiths
- Ethan Hardy − George Rainsford
- Alicia Munroe − Chelsea Halfpenny
- Lisa "Duffy" Duffin – Cathy Shipton
- Iain Dean – Michael Stevenson
- Lily Chao − Crystal Yu
- Caleb "Cal" Knight − Richard Winsor
- Dylan Keogh − William Beck
- Louise Tyler − Azuka Oforka
- David Hide – Jason Durr
- Noel Garcia − Tony Marshall
- Jez Andrews − Lloyd Everitt
- Robyn Miller – Amanda Henderson
- Max Walker – Jamie Davis
- Amira Zafar − Poppy Jhakra
- Sally Hodge − Pam St. Clement
- Josh Griffiths − Ian Bleasdale
- Jac Naylor − Rosie Marcel
- Henrik Hanssen − Guy Henry
- Adrian "Fletch" Fletcher − Alex Walkinshaw
- Grace Beauchamp − Emily Carey
- Kai Swift − Raif Clark
- Charlotte Swift − Daisy Douglas
- Steve Swift − Adam Foster
- Steph Sims − Tonicha Lawrence
- Harry Price − John Hogg
- Jay Faldren − Ben Turner
- Comfort Jones − Martina Laird
- Tess Bateman − Suzanne Packer
- Lenny Lyons − Steven Miller
- Alice Chantrey − Sam Grey
- John "Abs" Denham − James Redmond
- Mackenzie "Big Mac" Chalker − Charles Dale
- Mike Barratt − Clive Mantle
- Debbie Phillips − Holli Hoffman

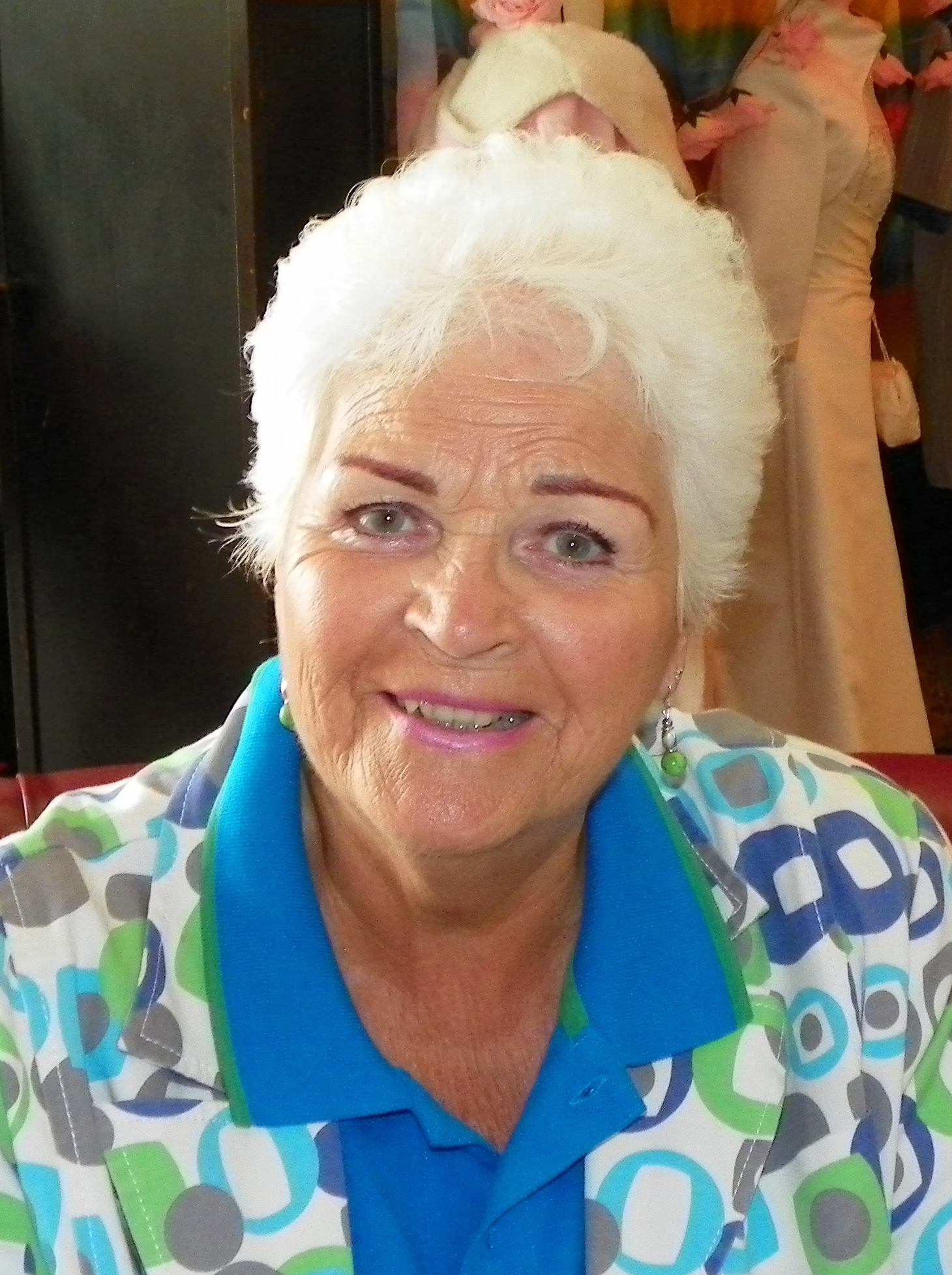
Pam St. Clement (pictured) guest appeared in the episode as patient Sally Hodge.

The official cast list for the episode was released by BBC Online on 19 August 2016; prior to this, the BBC and various media outlets revealed throughout late June and much of August, the various actors and their characters who would appear in the 30th anniversary special. The episode marked the permanent return of Cathy Shipton to the show, reprising her role as original nurse Lisa "Duffy" Duffin, following her guest appearances in the previous series, while Ian Bleasdale made a guest appearance throughout the episode, reprising his role as former paramedic Josh Griffiths. Three Holby City actors also performed as their characters for the special, their appearances announced on 28 June 2016 – these were Rosie Marcel as consultant cardiothoracic surgeon, Jac Naylor, Guy Henry as chief executive officer Holby City NHS Trust and consultant general surgeon, Henrik Hanssen, and Alex Walkinshaw as ward manager and former Casualty character, Adrian Fletcher.

Alongside Shipton and Bleasdale, a number of former actors from the show returned for the episode, each making a cameo appearance in the role of their respective former character and their scenes filmed in the style of giving a short video tribute to Charlie; these scenes are spaced out throughout the episode. Joining alongside Guy Henry, Amanda Mealing, Emily Carey and Jason Durr, all of whom did the same in the role of their own respective characters, these included: Charles Dale as Mackenzie "Big Mac" Chalker, Ben Turner as Jay Faldren, Suzanne Packer as Tess Bateman, Sam Grey as Alice Chantrey, James Redmond as John "Abs" Denham, Clive Mantle as Mike Barratt, Martina Laird as Comfort Jones, and Steven Miller as Lenny Lyons. In addition, former EastEnders actor, Pam St. Clement, made a guest appearance in the story as "very grumpy patient" Sally Hodge.

== Production ==
The show's executive producer Oliver Kent and series producer Erika Hossington began planning the thirtieth anniversary episode in 2014. Hossington said in an interview with Digital Spy that they wanted to do "something only Casualty could do", and that there would be "an absolutely massive stunt" which would see the hospital itself in jeopardy too. The episode itself was to originally last for 110-minutes, however this was later shortened to 99-minutes. In addition to this, it was also reported that the events which took take place in the thirtieth anniversary episode would set up to two years of new storylines. Kent stated that "a lot of storylines kicked off in this episode will deliver in the next year or two, and probably beyond." A special soundtrack was recorded by the BBC National Orchestra of Wales for the episode at BBC Hoddinott Hall in Cardiff Bay.

Director Steve Hughes stated he "couldn't believe" that the show was going to attempt a stunt so big. The stunt itself was shot over two days using "various stunts, visual effects and rigging teams" as opposed to shooting the stunt scene using computer-generated imagery. Although computer-generated imagery was used to add to the practical effects, the team decided to shoot the stunt practically so that the sequence felt "terrifyingly real". Hughes said the team shot about sixteen stunts over the two days of filming alone.

It was announced on 22 August 2016 that the stunt which would air as part of the thirtieth anniversary would be a helicopter crash into the emergency department after an air ambulance collides with a drone. Hossington revealed in an interview with Radio Times that the show had been working with the Association of Air Ambulances for over half a year on the storyline. The storyline was also created by the Association of Air Ambulances, who suggested the idea of an air ambulance colliding with a drone. Commenting on the storyline, Hossington said: "What you see in this episode is such a complex and unfortunate series of events."

== Promotion and broadcast ==
Promotion of the anniversary episode began immediately after the closure of the thirtieth series, with a 40-second teaser following the final episode. The trailer featured a party for Charlie Fairhead being interrupted by a serious event, followed by the tagline: "On the happiest day, their darkest hour". A second trailer, 30-seconds long, was released on 15 August 2016, while in the final five day build-up to the anniversary episode, Casualty released daily short trailers on their Facebook and Twitter pages, counting down to the episode.

Between the two series, Digital Spy also mentioned Casualty's thirtieth anniversary stunt, placing it as the number one moment to watch in their list of the "10 big moments that you have to see this week", before releasing a teaser article about the episode on the night of its airing, adding that it was "an episode you really do have to watch live." The episode was broadcast on BBC One on 27 August 2016 and was available to watch for thirty days afterwards on BBC iPlayer. In addition to this, "Too Old for This Shift" was made available for digital download via BBC Store on 27 August 2016 in standard definition, with higher definition later made available for purchase.

== Reception ==
=== Ratings ===
The episode received an overnight rating of 5.10 million viewers, a 26% share of the total audience. After seven days, the ratings rose to 6.53 million. Twenty-eight days later, the episode's rating continued to rise to a new total of 6.90 million viewers. BBC Media Centre later revealed the episode was watched by an audience of 7.20 million viewers. "Too Old for This Shift" saw a two million viewer increase in overall rating figures from the previous episode. The following episode decreased to 6.45 million viewers.

=== Critical reception ===
In August 2017, the helicopter crash was longlisted for Best Drama Storyline at the Inside Soap Awards. The nomination made the viewer-voted shortlist. On 6 November 2017, the helicopter crash won the "Best Drama Storyline" accolade. Radio Times reported that viewers were left "stunned" by the episode, while Digital Spy stated that fans were left in "shock and awe" over the episode. The Daily Mirror reporter Sharon Marshall praised the episode, branding it as a "pitch-perfect episode mixing gore, heartache, drama and nostalgia". Marshall added that the episode "showcased what Casualty does best – beautiful writing and a stellar cast who grab your heartstrings," before concluding her review by praising the episode as being able to make the show "look as fresh and exciting as the day it was born." However, the show also received criticism, with the episode being branded "insensitive" by the Midlands Air Ambulance Charity.
