= 22nd National Television Awards =

British awards ceremony in 2017

- Date: 25 January 2017
- Location: The O2 Arena, London
- Country: United Kingdom
- Presented by: Dermot O'Leary; Scarlett Moffatt (backstage)
- Website: http://www.nationaltvawards.com/

Television/radio coverage
- Network: ITV
- Runtime: 150 minutes (inc. adverts)

The 22nd National Television Awards were held at The O2 Arena on 25 January 2017. The awards were hosted by Dermot O'Leary and Scarlett Moffatt.

Until the 29th ceremony in 2024, this was the last time that the National Television Awards would air on a Wednesday.

== Performances ==
- Tom Jones
- James Arthur

== Awards ==
Category Presenter(s)	Winner	Nominated
"Challenge Show"; Presented by Alesha Dixon and Ashley Banjo	I'm a Celebrity...Get Me Out of Here! (ITV)	Love Island (ITV2); MasterChef (BBC One); The Apprentice (BBC One); The Great British Bake Off (BBC One)
"Drama"; Presented by Kate Richardson-Walsh and Hollie Webb	Casualty (BBC One)	Cold Feet (ITV); Game of Thrones (Sky Atlantic/HBO); Happy Valley (BBC One); The Night Manager (BBC One/AMC)
"Entertainment Programme"; Presented by Scarlett Moffatt	Ant & Dec's Saturday Night Takeaway (ITV)	Celebrity Juice (ITV2); The Graham Norton Show (BBC One); The Last Leg (Channel 4)
"Serial Drama Performance"; Presented by Martin Kemp and Roman Kemp	Lacey Turner (Stacey Fowler, EastEnders - BBC One)	Danny Miller (Aaron Dingle, Emmerdale - ITV); Jack P. Shepherd (David Platt, Coronation Street - ITV); Natalie J. Robb (Moira Dingle, Emmerdale - ITV)
"Comedy"; Presented by Ken Dodd	Mrs. Brown's Boys (BBC One/RTÉ One)	Benidorm (ITV); Orange is the New Black (Netflix); The Big Bang Theory (E4/CBS)
"Live Magazine Show"; Presented by Gary Lineker and Alan Shearer	This Morning (ITV)	BBC Breakfast (BBC One); Loose Women (ITV); Sunday Brunch (Channel 4); The One Show (BBC One)
"Newcomer"; Presented by Joe Wicks	Faye Brookes (Kate Connor, Coronation Street - ITV)	Duncan James (Ryan Knight, Hollyoaks - Channel 4); Lloyd Everitt (Jez Andrews, Casualty - BBC One); Tilly Keeper (Louise Mitchell, EastEnders - BBC One)
"Period Drama"; Presented by Michelle Keegan and Tina Moore	Call the Midwife (BBC One)	Peaky Blinders (BBC Two); Poldark (BBC One); Stranger Things (Netflix); Victoria (ITV)
"Daytime"; Presented by Piers Morgan and Susanna Reid	The Chase (ITV)	Come Dine with Me (Channel 4); Pointless (BBC One); The Jeremy Kyle Show (ITV)
"TV Presenter"; Presented by Judge Rinder	Ant & Dec	Gary Lineker; James Corden; Mel & Sue; Rylan Clark-Neal
"TV Judge"; Presented by William and Molly	Mary Berry	David Walliams; Len Goodman; Nicole Scherzinger; Simon Cowell
"Drama Performance"; Presented by Kris Marshall	Sarah Lancashire (Happy Valley - BBC One)	Cillian Murphy (Peaky Blinders - BBC Two); Jenna Coleman (Victoria - ITV); Tom Hiddleston (The Night Manager - BBC One)
"Factual Entertainment"; Presented by Danny Dyer	Gogglebox (Channel 4)	DIY SOS: The Big Build (BBC One); Making a Murderer (Netflix); Paul O'Grady: For the Love of Dogs (ITV); Ambulance (BBC One); Tattoo Fixers (E4)
"Serial Drama"; Presented by Penny Lancaster and Ayda Field	Emmerdale (ITV)	Coronation Street (ITV); EastEnders (BBC One); Hollyoaks (E4/Channel 4)
"Talent Show"; Presented by Emma Willis and Pixie Lott	Strictly Come Dancing (BBC One)	Britain's Got Talent (ITV); The X Factor (ITV)
"Special Recognition"; Presented by Hugh Bonneville	Graham Norton	
