= Charlie Fairhead =

Fictional character from the BBC medical dramas Casualty and Holby City

- Casualty character
- Derek Thompson as Charlie Fairhead
- First appearance: "Gas"; 6 September 1986
- Last appearance: "40th Anniversary Part 2"; 5 September 2026
- Created by: Jeremy Brock; Paul Unwin
- Portrayed by: Derek Thompson; Baxter Westby (flashback); Ryan Owen (flashback); Jack Franklin (flashback)
- Spin-off(s): Holby City (1999, 2005, 2010, 2012); HolbyBlue (2007)
- Duration: 1986–2024, 2026

In-universe information
- Occupation: Senior charge nurse, Emergency nurse practitioner, (prev.; Clinical nurse manager; Charge nurse; Clinical nurse specialist; Retired (2024-present)
- Family: Elizabeth Fairhead (stepmother)
- Spouses: Baz Hayes (1998–2001); Lisa Duffin (2017–2020)
- Children: Louis Fairhead (Son)
- Relatives: Megan Wark (granddaughter)
- Nationality: British English

Charlie Fairhead, played by Derek Thompson, is a fictional character from the BBC British medical drama Casualty. The longest-serving character on the show, his tenure spanned more than three decades from the series' inception in 1986 until his departure in 2024.

Thompson took a nine-month break from Series 18, returning on 1 January 2005 in Series 19. After four further months off-screen, he returned in the series 20 Christmas crossover with Holby City, airing on 24 December 2005.

Thompson regularly took breaks every year and by May 2023 he confirmed he had chosen to leave his role as Charlie, after 38 years on-screen. Thompson filmed his final scenes in 2023, which were broadcast on 16 March 2024. Thompson reprised his role for the show's 40th anniversary in 2026.

Thompson appeared four times as Charlie in Casualty's sister show, Holby City, including the February 2010 episode in which Charlie has a heart attack; his final appearance in Holby City was in October 2012 when he interviewed Chantelle Lane (Lauren Drummond) for a full-time nursing position. Thompson also made an appearance in Holby City spin-off police drama HolbyBlue in its first episode, aired in May 2007.

== Storyline ==
In the early days of Casualty, Charlie was depicted as a leader figure with a good sense of humour but a short temper, which occasionally got him caught in strife when dealing with people higher than himself.

== Relationships ==
He has dated numerous women during the show. The most notable is Barbara Hayes – another original character – who was eventually his wife. Baz left Casualty after series one but returned nearly a decade later. Unhappily married, she reconciles with Charlie and falls pregnant with their son, Louis. Baz divorces her husband and marries Charlie in 1998 but they separate when Baz gets a job in Canada two years later. She briefly returns in late 2003 to visit her father but dies after a road accident so Charlie gets full custody of Louis.

== Development ==
He is described by the BBC as "the lynchpin of Holby's Emergency Department. [...] an indispensable, trustworthy and diplomatic member of the team." Series producer Oliver Kent has described Charlie as "by far our most important character" and "absolutely core to the show's success". In 2012, Inside Soap described Charlie and Tess as 'the mum and dad of Casualty'.

Producer Nikki Wilson talked about the importance of Charlie and Tess saying, "I think we must keep them around. Charlie has been in the show for nearly 30 years, and he's such an iconic character. It's fantastic he's still here. His relationship with Tess is quite important – as you say, they're like the parents of the whole department – so long may it continue." In 2014, series producer, Erika Hossington spoke to Digital Spy about the show's plans for Charlie, saying, "We've got a small story that will show in the first third of series 29. However, we've also got bigger plans for him, which will begin in the final third of series 29 and continue towards the thirtieth anniversary." She continued to say how Charlie will be the "centre of the thirtieth anniversary" and "for that to be impactful, they have to build up to that". "Charlie's older fans will have complete satisfaction. I think Charlie is the heart of the show and should always be central, hence why he is going there."

== Reception ==
In August 2017, Thompson was long-listed for "Best Drama Star" at the Inside Soap Awards, while Charlie's wedding to Duffy was long-listed for "Best Drama Storyline." Both nominations made the viewer-voted shortlist, but Thompson did not win any awards. Charlie and Duffy's partnership was nominated for "Best Soap Couple" at the 2018 Digital Spy Reader Awards. They came in tenth place with 3.8% of the total votes.

In the 1996 book The Guinness Book of Classic British TV, it was noted that "Thompson has created a character who has been described as television's first 'new man'." They added that via his range of storylines, Charlie "has been through hell and back."
