= Lloyd Everitt =

Welsh actor

- Born: 20 March 1987 (age 39)
- Education: Royal Welsh College of Music & Drama
- Occupation: Actor
- Years active: 2006–present

Lloyd Alexander A. Everitt (born 20 March 1987) is a Welsh actor. In 2015 at 27, he was the youngest actor to play Othello at Shakespeare's Globe. He was nominated for Best Newcomer at the National Television Awards for his role in the BBC One medical drama Casualty (2016–2017).

== Early life ==
Everitt is from Barry in the Vale of Glamorgan. He was born to Jamaican mother Pauline and Welsh father Haydn, and he has a sister. He attended Gladstone Primary School and Barry Boys' School. He graduated from the Royal Welsh College of Music & Drama in 2010. Everitt was diagnosed with dyslexia while at drama school, where he was taught to use illustrations to help him learn lines. He is an ambassador for the British Dyslexia Association.

== Filmography ==
=== Film ===
| Year | Title | Role | Notes |
|---|---|---|---|
| 2009 | 17 | John | Short film |
| 2015 | Julius | Jay Jay | Short film |
| 2017 | Sugar | Ellis | Short film |
| 2021 | Pressure | Gareth | Short film |
| 2022 | A Violent Man | SO Brooks | |
| 2022 | Boys Don't Cry | Lloyd | Short film |
| TBA | The Chelsea Cowboy | Anson | Upcoming |
| TBA | Ire | | Upcoming |

=== Television ===
| Year | Title | Role | Notes |
|---|---|---|---|
| 2006, 2008 | Torchwood | Mikey / Youth | 2 episodes |
| 2009 | Made in Wales | James | Episode: "Ctrl-Alt-Delete" |
| 2011 | Alys | Brawd Mike | 4 episodes |
| 2012 | Emmerdale | Ed Roberts | 16 episodes |
| 2014, 2016–2017 | Holby City | Noah Farnum / Jez Andrews | 4 episodes |
| 2015 | New Tricks | Matt Whitechurch | Episode: "The Curate's Egg" |
| 2016–2017 | Casualty | Jez Andrews | 59 episodes |
| 2018 | Nick Helm: The Killing Machine | | Television short |
| 2019 | Flack | Patrick Andrews | 2 episodes |
| 2019 | Tourist Trap | Iestyn | Main role; series 2 |
| 2019 | Midsomer Murders | Harper Kaplan | Episode: "With Bated Breath" |
| 2020 | Death in Paradise | Josh Hunter | Episode: "Tour De Murder" |
| 2020 | Bang | Mark | 2 episodes |
| 2020 | The Deceived | Richard | Miniseries |
| 2022 | Silent Witness | David Mashaba | Main role; series 25 |
| 2022 | The Sandman | Hector Hall | 3 episodes |
| 2022 | The Pact | Will | Main role, 6 episodes |
| 2025 | Alien: Earth | Hoyt | 2 episodes |

== Stage ==
| Year | Title | Role | Notes |
|---|---|---|---|
| 2010 | The Dug Out | Sammy | Bristol Old Vic, Bristol |
| 2011 | Luise Miller | Chancellor’s Page | Donmar Warehouse, London |
| 2011 | King Lear | King of France | West Yorkshire Playhouse, Leeds |
| 2012 | Chariots of Fire | Jonathan / Athlete | Hampstead Theatre / Gielgud Theatre, London |
| 2013 | Much Ado About Nothing | Claudio | Old Vic, London |
| 2014 | Perseverance Drive | Errol | Bush Theatre, London |
| 2015 | Othello | Othello | Globe Theatre, London |
| 2015 | We Want You to Watch | | Royal National Theatre, London |
| 2018 | For King and Country | Hargreaves | Southwark Playhouse, London |
| 2018 | The Double Dealer | Malefont | Orange Tree Theatre, Richmond |

== Audio ==
| Year | Title | Role | Notes |
|---|---|---|---|
| 2020 | Heart of Cardiff | Trix | Sherman Theatre, Cardiff |

== Awards and nominations ==
| Year | Award | Category | Work | Result | Ref. |
|---|---|---|---|---|---|
| 2013 | WhatsOnStage Awards | Best Ensemble Performance | Chariots of Fire | Nominated | (Note: Shared with Chariots of Fire cast.) |
| 2017 | National Television Awards | Best Newcomer | Casualty | Nominated | |
