= Cathy Shipton =

English actress

- Born: Catherine Ellen Shipton; 27 March 1957 (age 69); Lewisham, London, England
- Education: Rose Bruford College
- Occupation: Actress
- Years active: 1984–present
- Partner: Christopher Guard
- Children: 1

Catherine Ellen Shipton (born 27 March 1957) is an English actress, best known for playing Lisa "Duffy" Duffin in the BBC medical drama Casualty. After leaving the series in 2020, she has since appeared in the Channel 4 soap opera Hollyoaks as Lydia Smith.

== Biography ==
Born to Irish-English parents, Shipton was raised as a Roman Catholic, and was educated in a convent in south London. She studied two languages and journalism, but her drama teacher told her that she had the potential to become an actress, and consequently she trained at Rose Bruford College from 1977 to 1980.

== Career ==
Shipton was originally considered for the role of receptionist Susie Mercier in the BBC medical drama Casualty, but was eventually cast as nurse Lisa "Duffy" Duffin in 1986, as part of the original cast. She continued to star in the series until 1993, when she chose to leave. She later made a guest appearance in February 1998. Shipton returned as a regular cast member in September 1998, before leaving the series for a second time in 2003. During her second stint on the show, she guest appeared in Casualty's spinoff series Holby City as Duffy. Shipton reprised her role for two episodes in 2006 to celebrate the show's twentieth anniversary celebrations, as well as returning for two further episodes in 2015. In June 2016, it was announced that Shipton would guest appear in the show's thousandth episode, before returning to the show as a regular cast member in August. The character was killed off on 1 February 2020.

In August 2021, it was announced that Shipton had been cast in the Channel 4 soap opera Hollyoaks, in the guest role of Lydia. Then in 2024, she appeared in an episode of the BBC daytime soap opera Doctors as Melissa Horner.

== Filmography ==
Year	Title	Role	Notes
1985	Hold the Back Page	Receptionist	Episode: "Away from Home"
1986–1993, 1998–2003, 2006, 2015–2020	Casualty	Duffy	Series regular
1986	The Theban Plays by Sophocles	Theban Citizen	Episode: "Oedipus the King"
1990	Little Sir Nicholas	Dulcie	Main role
1990	One Foot in the Grave	Mrs Burridge	Episode: "Who's Listening"
1996	Agent Z and the Penguin from Mars	Mrs. Simpson	Film
1996	Taggart	Sarah Price	Episode: "Devil's Advocate Part One"
1996	The Bill	Alice Merchant	Episode: "All in the Mind"
1997	Spice World	Midwife	Film
1999	Holby City	Duffy	Episode: "Knife Edge"
2003	The Bill	Liz Clough	Episode: "162: Face Consequences"
2004	Doctors	Jenny Andrews	Episode: "Lost and Found"
2008	Doctors	Elaine Finney	Episode: "Changes"
2021	Hollyoaks	Lydia	Guest role
2021	Mercy	Lawyer 2	Film
2024	Doctors	Melissa Horner	Episode: "Shock Therapy"
