= Paul Unwin (director) =

British film director

Paul Andrew Unwin (born 25 November 1957) is a film, theatre, TV writer / director.

== Early life ==
He was born in Reading, Berkshire. He studied drama at the University of Bristol, where he met Jeremy Brock in 1979.

== Career ==
=== TV ===
Unwin co-created the world's longest running medical drama, Casualty. He was a regular writer throughout the first two series and also wrote the 30th anniversary episodes at the start of series 30.

Holby City and HolbyBlue are spin-offs from the original Casualty format.

Unwin has directed extensively in TV including Five Little Pigs, Messiah and recently, Combat Hospital (ABC/Global), Shameless (Company Pictures, Channel 4) and Breathless. Breathless screened on ITV in Autumn 2013 and in the US in 2014.

=== Theatre ===
As a theatre director his work includes The Man Who Had All the Luck by Arthur Miller at the Bristol Old Vic and the Young Vic, The Misanthrope at the Bristol Old Vic and the Royal National Theatre, The Master Builder at the Bristol Old Vic, Hamlet, Othello, In Times Like These by Jeremy Brock. His artistic directorship of the Bristol Old Vic was a remarkable period and launched the careers of several of Britain's foremost actors and directors.

As a playwright, Unwin's plays include This Much Is True, about the shooting of a Brazilian electrician by the British police, This House is Haunted, a ghost story based on real events, and The Promise, about the 1945 Labour government and the birth of the NHS.

=== Film ===
Unwin directed The American (BBC Films/WGBH Boston), written by Michael Hastings from the novel by Henry James.

His short film, Syrup (Channel 4/First Choice Films), was written by Nick Vivian. It was nominated for an Academy Award and a BAFTA. It also won he Jury Prize at the Cannes Film Festival, the Best Short Film at the Valladolid and the Amnesty International Film of the Year Award.

Unwin also directed Elijah (Anagram Pictures/CTV TV), a film about the indigenous struggle in northern Canada, written by Blake Corbett. Elijah won the 2008 Leo Award for Best Feature Length Drama and the 2009 Gemini Award for Best TV Movie. Elijah is a political comedy.
