= Be Alright =

Be Alright may refer to:

- "Be Alright" (Ariana Grande song), 2016
- "Be Alright" (Dean Lewis song), 2018
- "Be Alright" (Kristine W song), 2009
- "Be Alright" (Zapp song), 1981
- "Be Alright", a 2013 song by Anttix
- "Be Alright", a 2012 song by Justin Bieber from Believe
- "Be Alright", a 2021 song by Evan Craft featuring Danny Gokey and Redimi2
- "Be Alright", a 2009 song by Moka Only from Lowdown Suite 2… The Box
- Be Alright, an extended play by Ive
