= Adrian Harris =

English actor, playwright and director

Adrian Harris (born Adrian Michael Harris) is an English actor, playwright and director.

== Early life ==
Harris was born in Kingswood, near Bristol, and attended Kingsfield School. Later he trained as an actor at the Academy of Live and Recorded Arts in London.

== Career ==
=== Actor ===
He has appeared in roles on TV productions such as This Is England for SKY as Duncan Selbie, Waking the Dead (Series 5) and Five Daughters for BBC1, the BBC3 sitcom Clone, and Teachers for Channel 4. More recently he was the stage manager in transatlantic sitcom Episodes (series 4, episode 9), Jay Isaacs in Coronation Street and Norman Burnton in BBC1's Casualty as Norman Burnton – the rather nerdy paramedic at Holby ED.

Theatre roles include Jonathan Crew in Deep Pit and Cliff in Engineers' Blue at Brass Works Theatre (both directed by Anna Girvan), Jimmy in Digits at the Tobacco Factory, Ryan in Drunks and Warriors at the Ustinov Theatre, Bath, Malvolio in RoughHouse's Twelfth Night, Dr. Rank in A Doll's House for SWAN and Laertes/Guildernstern/1st Player in Hamlet for Festival Players Theatre Co – national tour.

=== Director ===
As a director Harris has directed Sherlock Holmes and the Adventure of the Blue Carbuncle and The Mystery of the Hound of the Baskervilles at Brass Works Theatre, The Fairer Race for Game:play at the Ustinov Theatre/Bath Spa, Scripts @ Starbucks for Southwest Scriptwriters, Saturday Shorts at the Bristol Folk House and the radio series The Adventures of Heronimous Verdi for BCFM.

In 2012, he created Brass Works Theatre – South Gloucestershire’s first professional theatre venue – and he is the current Artistic Director., The first production was Engineers' Blue, supported using public funding by the National Lottery through Arts Council England and South Gloucestershire Council. It was followed by The Mystery of the Hound of the Baskervilles .

=== Writer ===
As a writer Harris is a member of Southwest Scriptwriters and The Writers' Forum @ The Tobacco Factory Theatre. His first theatre play Shoes was staged as part of Start Nights at Hampstead Theatre in 2005. In 2007, the double-bill of Call Me and Post Box were premiered at the Alma Theatre, Bristol, followed by Tommy's Wait at Plays for the Pro Cathedral in Bristol. In that same year Harris's feature-length screenplay was runner up in the South West Screen Screenwriter Competition. In 2011, Harris was commissioned by the Writers' Forum at the Ustinov Theatre to write The Fairer Race for Game:play with Bath Spa University, which was performed as February’s Script Factory. This was followed by Exit Only, which was Harris’s play written for the 24 Hour Plays at the Theatre Royal Bath – Ustinov Studio. In 2012, Harris received a grant from the Peggy Ramsay Foundation to write Engineers' Blue. His play Deep Pit was long listed and made the readers' top 40 in the Bruntwood Prize for Playwriting in 2013. Deep Pit was then successfully produced at Brass Works Theatre with a Grants for the Arts from Arts Council England. Adrian graduated from Royal Holloway University of London with a Master’s degree with Merit in Screenwriting.
