= King's Oak Academy =

Location
- Brook Road; Kingswood, Gloucestershire, BS15 4JT; England; 51°27′40″N 2°29′04″W

Information
- Type: Academy
- Motto: Work hard, Be kind
- Established: 1921
- Trust: Cabot Learning Federation
- Department for Education URN: 137106 Tables
- Ofsted: Reports
- Principal: Kathrine Ogden
- Gender: Mixed
- Age: 4 to 16
- Enrolment: 950
- Capacity: 1,200
- Houses: Olympus, Orpheus, Pegasus, Hercules
- Colours: Royal blue and charcoal grey
- Former name: Kingswood Grammar School
- Website: https://kingsoakacademy.clf.uk/

King's Oak Academy, formerly Kingsfield School and Kingswood Grammar School, is a Mathematics and Computing College located in Kingswood in Bristol, England. The education authority Ofsted rated it as "good" in 2018.

== Location and admissions ==
The school is located just within the unitary authority of South Gloucestershire, which borders Bristol. It is situated at the roundabout of the A420 and the A4174 (Bristol ring road), between Warmley Hill and Warmley.

It is a mixed comprehensive school providing education for 950 students as of May 2021, predominantly from a catchment area of around 3 miles (4.8 km).

== History ==
=== Grammar school ===
The school was founded in 1921 as Kingswood Grammar School (KGS), a co-educational grammar school administered by the Gloucestershire Education Committee.

In the 1960s the school had around 850 boys and girls, with 250 in the sixth form.

=== Comprehensive school ===
By 1970 it had been converted into a comprehensive school and was renamed Kingsfield School. The school was rebuilt after burning to the ground in 1976.

=== Academy ===
Kingsfield School was rebranded as King's Oak Academy in September 2011. Its motto is "Work hard, be kind".

== Notable alumni ==
- Janet Anderson (1949-2023), politician
- Anttix (b. 1989), musician
- David Drew (b. 1952), politician
- Adrian Harris (b. 1970), actor
- Bernard Lovell (1913–2012), physicist and radio astronomer
- Kerry-Anne Mendoza (b. 1981), author
- Colin Pillinger (1943–2013), planetary scientist
- Mary Prior (b. 1942), businesswoman
- Richard Scudamore (b. 1959), sports executive
- James Tooley (b. 1959), academic
- Robert Willis (1947-2024), clergyman

== Kingswood Rugby Club ==
Kingswood RFC Old Boys was founded in 1954/55 by a group of former students of Kingswood Grammar School. The club continues to play in the grammar school's blue and brown colours.
