= List of Casualty characters =

Casualty is a British medical drama television series that has been broadcast on BBC One in the United Kingdom since 6 September 1986. The series was created by Jeremy Brock and Paul Unwin and focuses on the fictional lives, both professional and personal, of the medical and ancillary staff at the Accident and Emergency Department of the fictional Holby City Hospital, currently based in the equally fictitious city of Holby. It is the longest-running primetime and emergency medical drama television series in the world. It was primarily filmed in the city of Bristol until 2011, when it began filming at Roath Lock Studios in Cardiff, where it has remained since. The show has aired forty full series with over 1000 episodes and is currently airing the forty-first series. Brock and Unwin devised the serial after being inspired by the "comedy and heroics" of life in the National Health Service (NHS) and tackled a string of controversial topics through the show. A spin-off series, Holby City, began airing from 1999 and follows patients' stories after they are transferred to the hospital's surgical wards. The show was cancelled in 2022 and concluded the following year. A police procedural spin-off, HolbyBlue, began airing from 8 May 2007, running for two series before being cancelled due to poor viewing figures.

The serial features an ensemble cast of regular and recurring characters, beginning with ten main characters in its first series. Since the show's inception, characters have been written in and out of the series. Having appeared in 901 episodes between the first episode and series 38, the show's longest-serving character is nurse Charlie Fairhead, portrayed by Derek Thompson. Additionally, Casualty features a number of guest artists in each episode as well as recurring characters who appear in story arcs. Many regular cast members in the show have made prior, minor appearances as both patients and staff members in both Casualty and Holby City. In the event where more than one actor has portrayed a character, the most recent actor to have portrayed the character is listed last. In 2004, casting directors hired Susan Cookson for the regular role of Maggie Coldwell after a recurring part as anaesthetist Julie Day between 1998 and 2000. Characters from Casualty have appeared in spin-off series Holby City and HolbyBlue and vice versa. Although most characters only guest star, some have become regular cast members. Jaye Jacobs joined Casualty as Donna Jackson in 2023, following a twelve-year stint in Holby City. Amanda Mealing joined Casualty as Connie Beauchamp in 2014, following a six-year stint in Holby City. Nick Jordan actor Michael French has had stints in the main cast of both Holby City and Casualty, and Clive Mantle reprised his role as Mike Barratt in Holby City in 1999, two years after leaving Casualty.

== Present characters ==
=== Regular characters ===
Character	Actor	First appearance (Note: The original broadcast date of the character's first appearance.)	Ref.
Dylan Keogh	William Beck	12 March 2011	
Iain Dean	Michael Stevenson	28 April 2012	
Jacob Masters	Charles Venn	18 July 2015	
Rash Masum	Neet Mohan	4 November 2017	
Jan Jenning	Di Botcher	19 May 2018	
Faith Cadogan	Kirsty Mitchell	28 December 2019	
Stevie Nash	Elinor Lawless	14 August 2021	
Theodore "Teddy" Gowan	Milo Clarke	14 August 2021	
Jodie Whyte	Anna Chell	8 April 2023	
Cameron Mickelthwaite	Barney Walsh	8 April 2023	
Rida Amaan	Sarah Seggari	8 April 2023	
Siobhan McKenzie	Melanie Hill	24 February 2024	
Nicole Piper	Sammy T. Dobson	23 March 2024	
Indie Jankowski	Naomi Wakszlak	28 December 2024	
Flynn Byron	Olly Rix	15 March 2025	
Matty Linlaker	Aron Julius	10 January 2026	

=== Recurring characters ===
Character	Actor(s)	First appearance	Ref.
Blake Gardner	Kai Thorne	3 June 2017	
Blake Gardner	David Ajayi	3 June 2017	
Luka Malinovsky	Tom Mulheron	18 January 2020	
Natalia Malinovsky	Lollie McKenzie	18 January 2020	
Natalia Malinovsky	Zoe Brough	18 January 2020	

== Former characters ==
=== Regular characters ===
Former Casualty cast

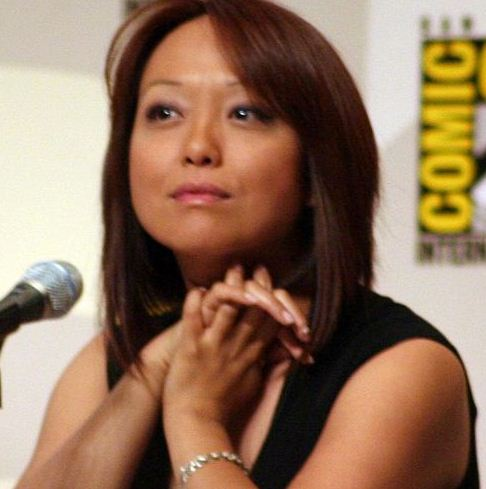
Naoko Mori (Mie Nisha-Kawa)

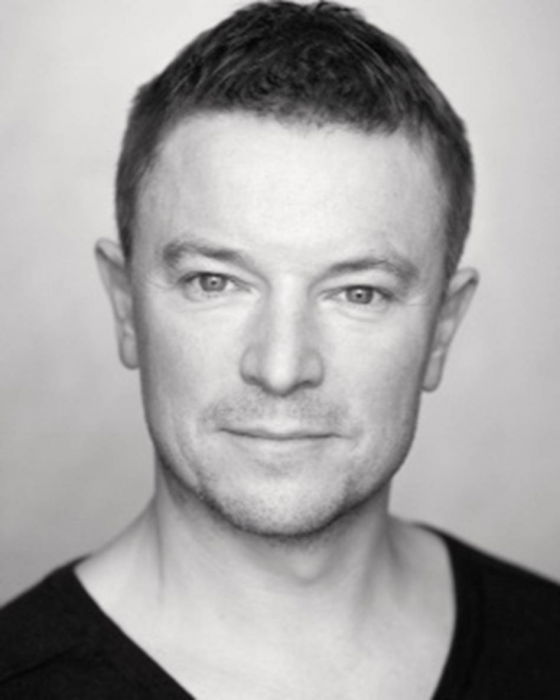
Craig Kelly (Daniel Perryman)

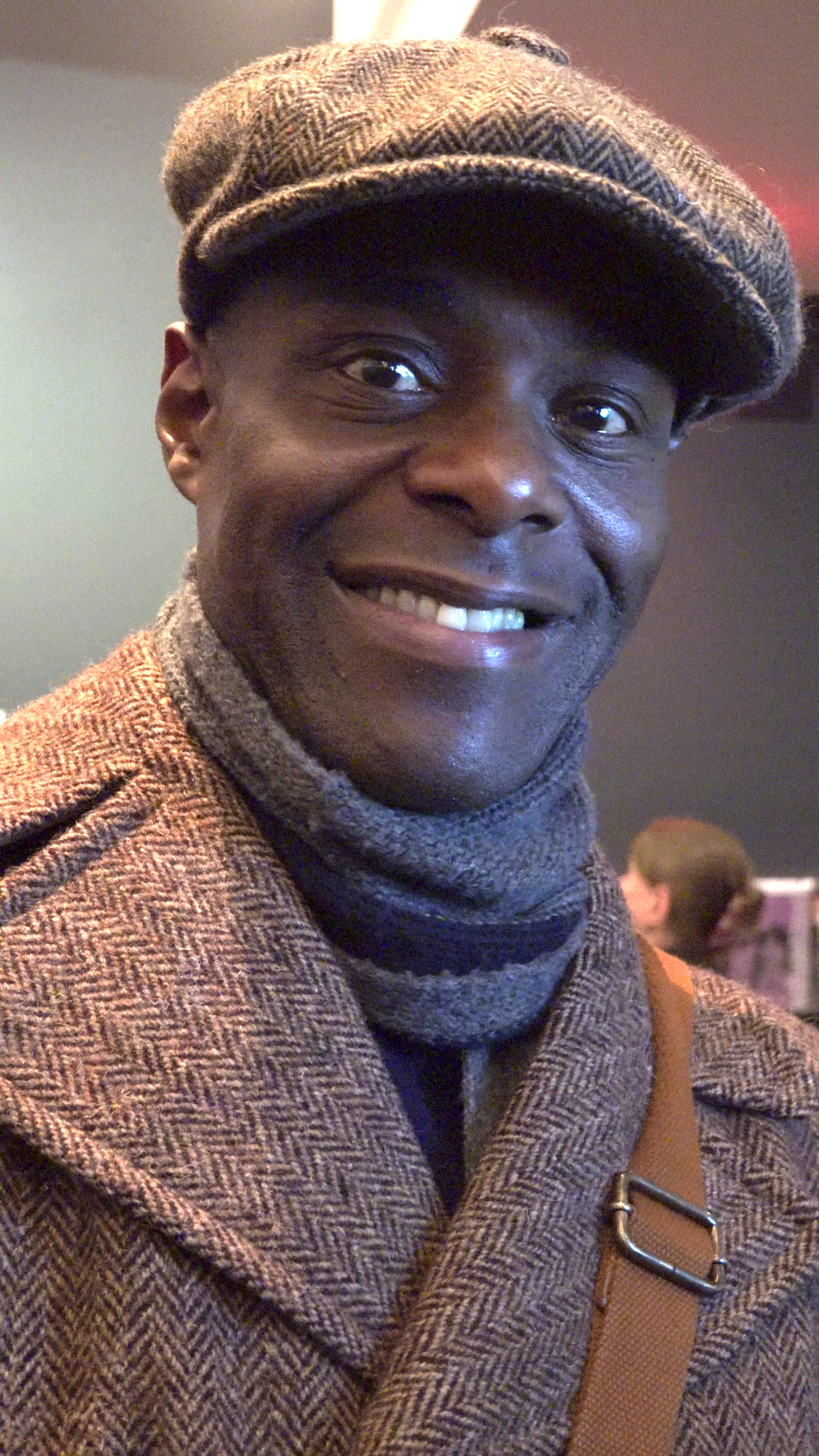
Paterson Joseph (Mark Grace)

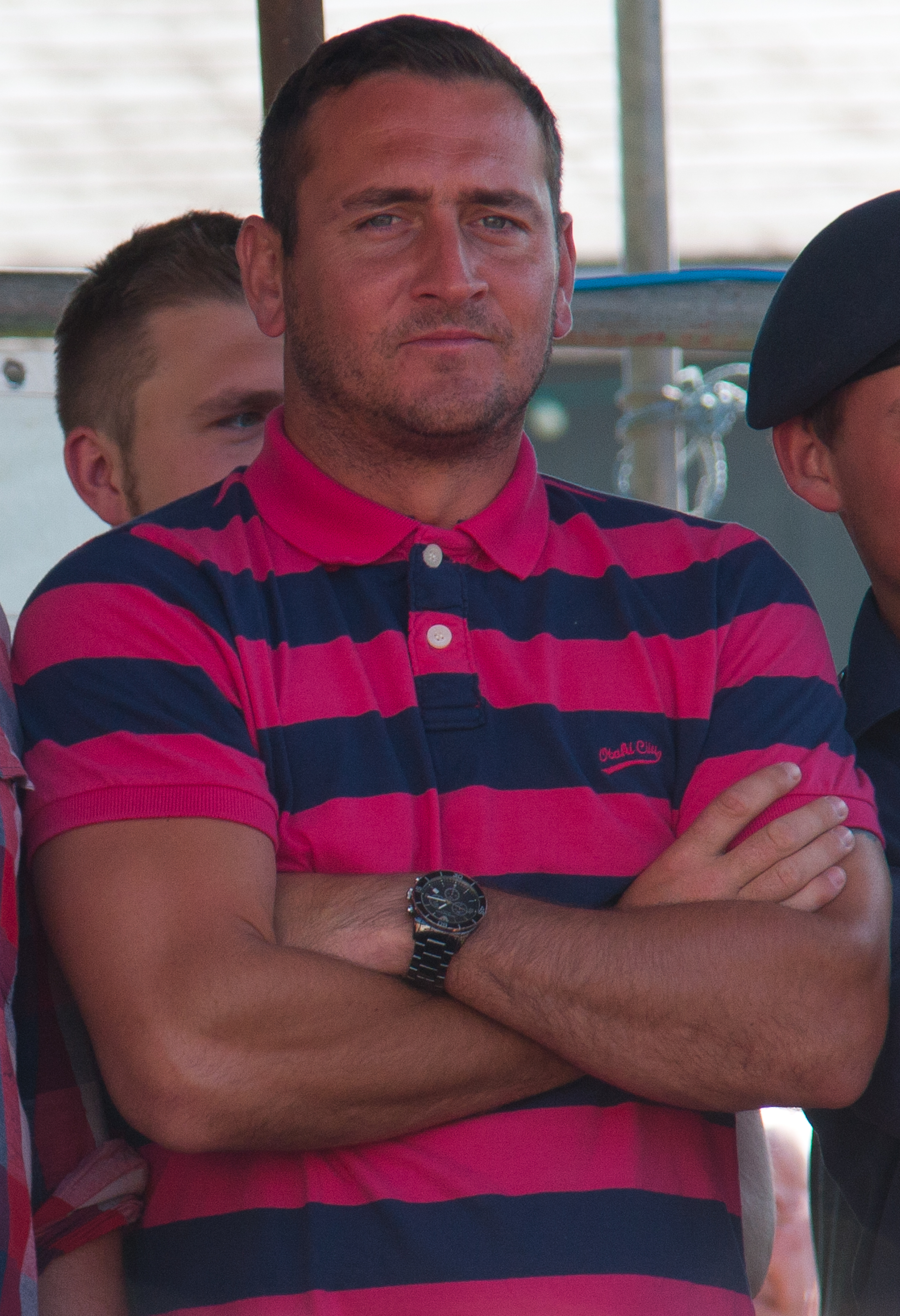
Will Mellor (Jack Vincent)

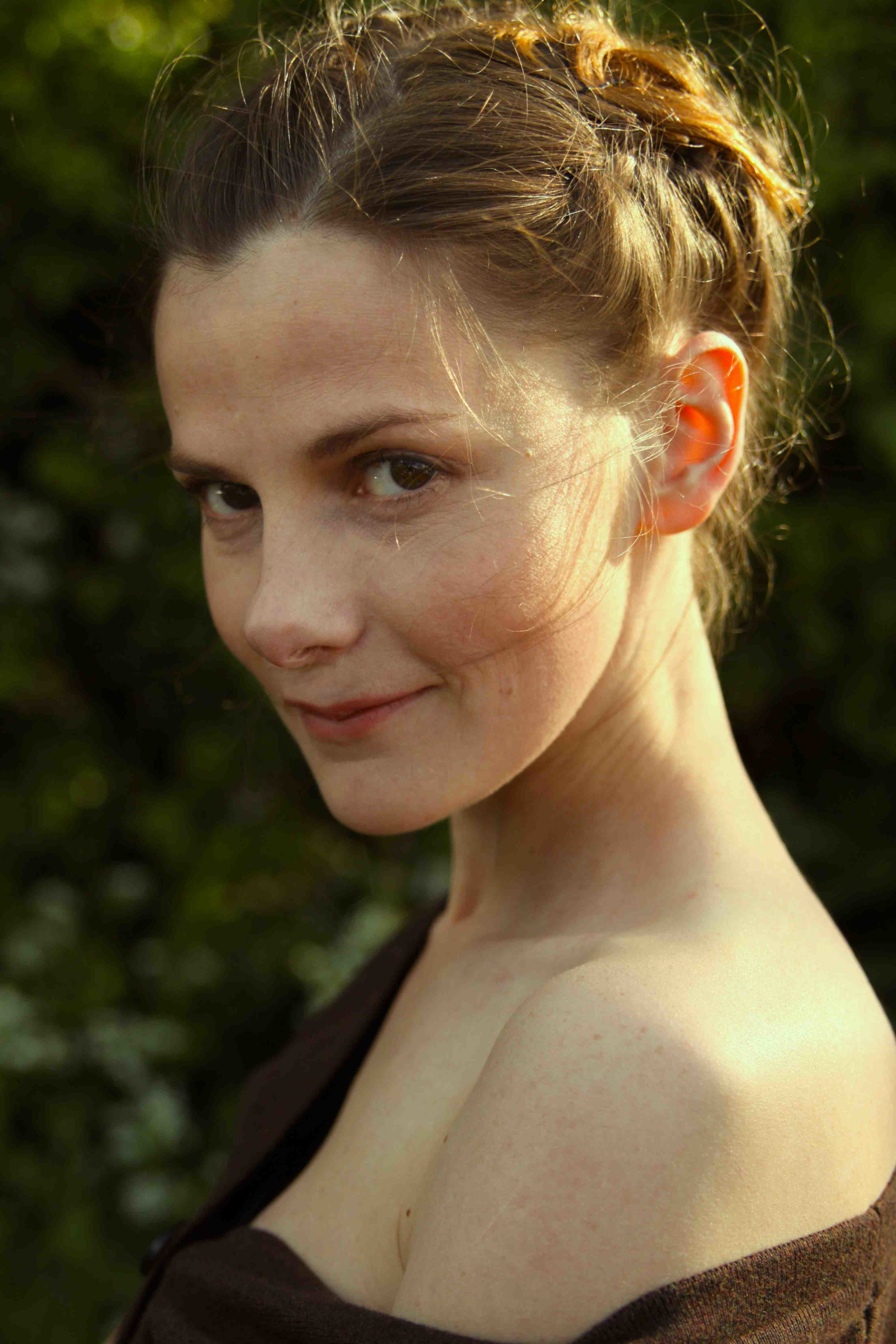
Loo Brealey (Roxy Bird)

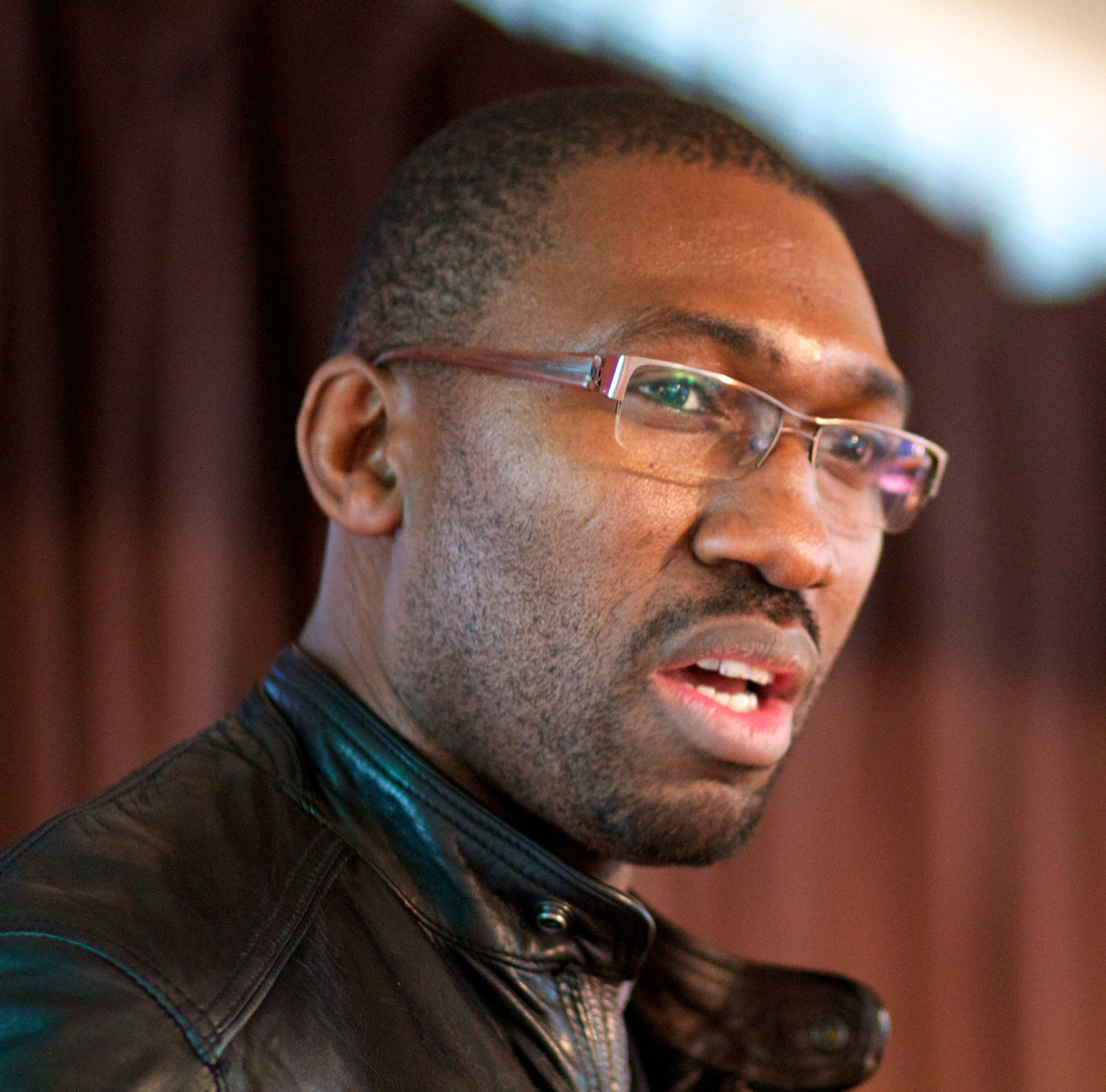
Kwame Kwei-Armah (Fin Newton)

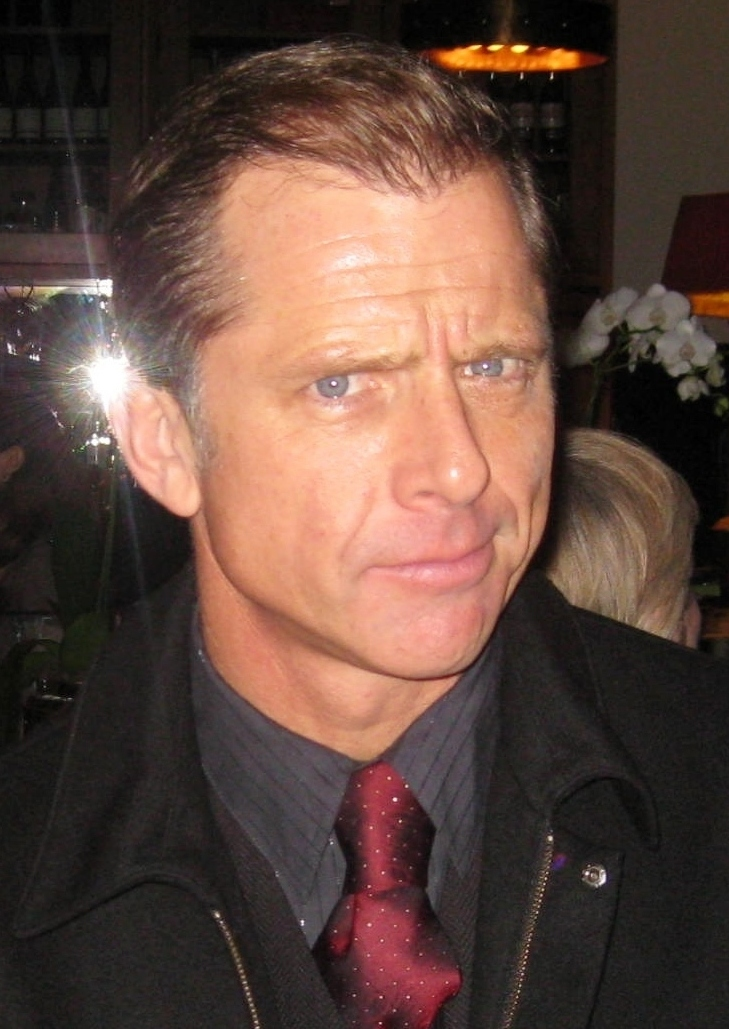
Maxwell Caulfield (Jim Brodie)

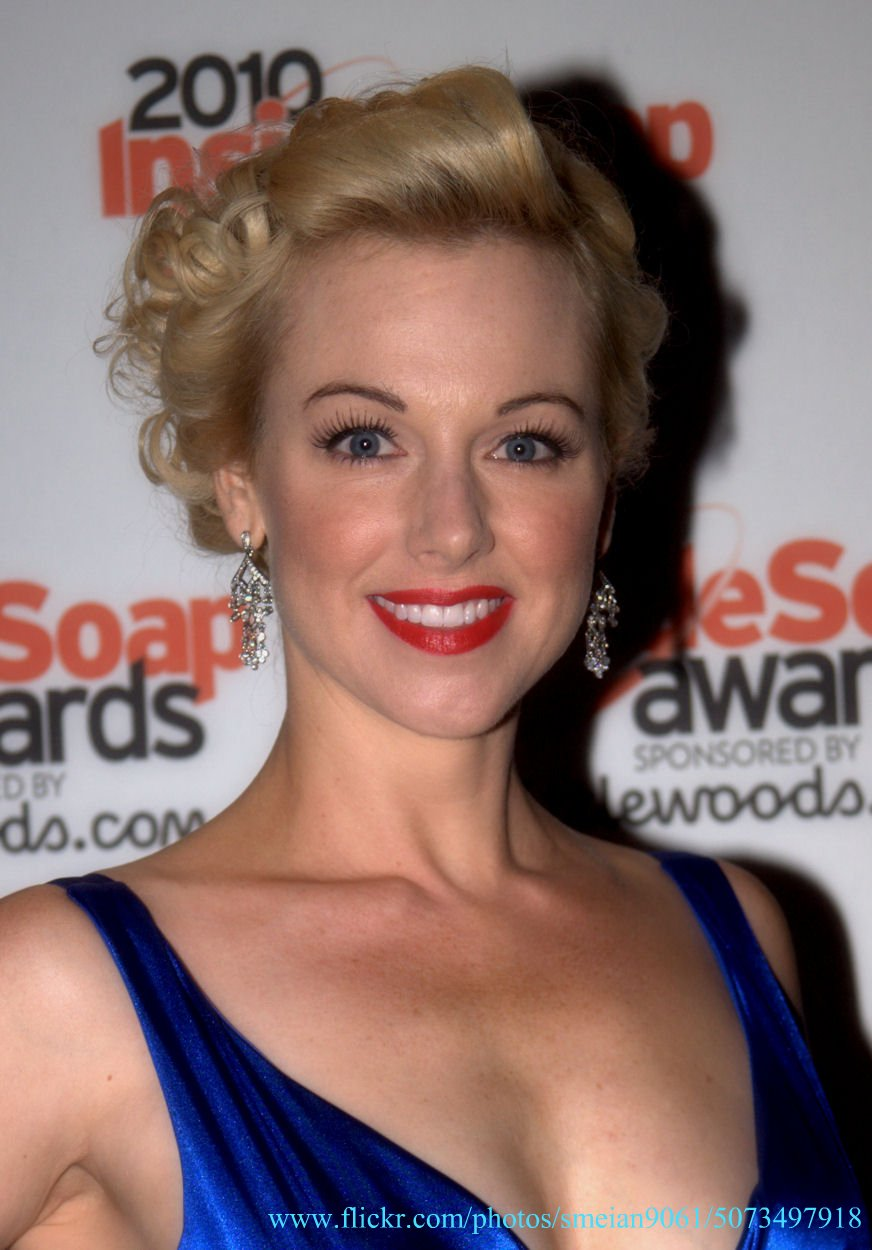
Sarah Manners (Bex Reynolds)

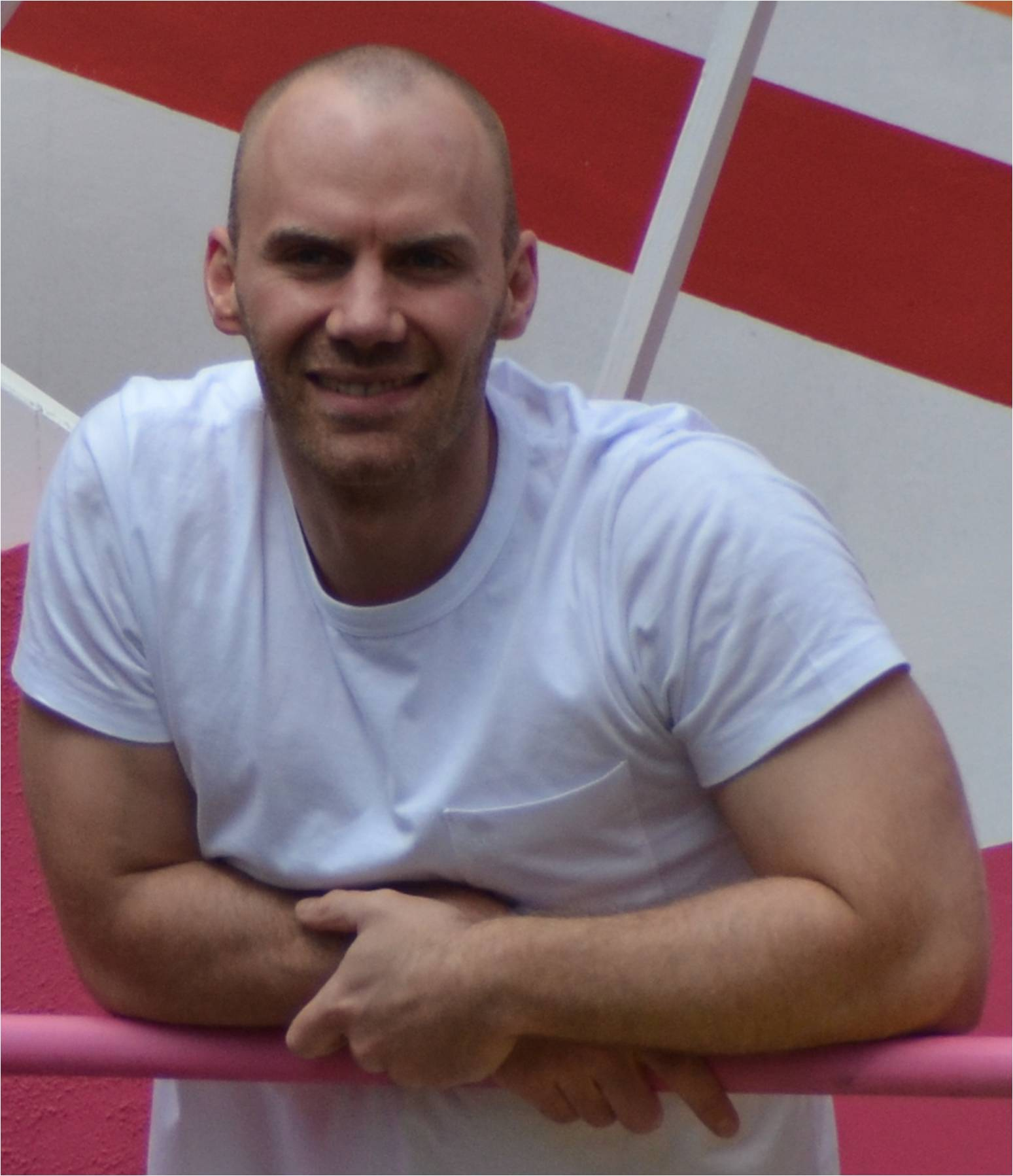
Will Thorp (Woody Joyner)

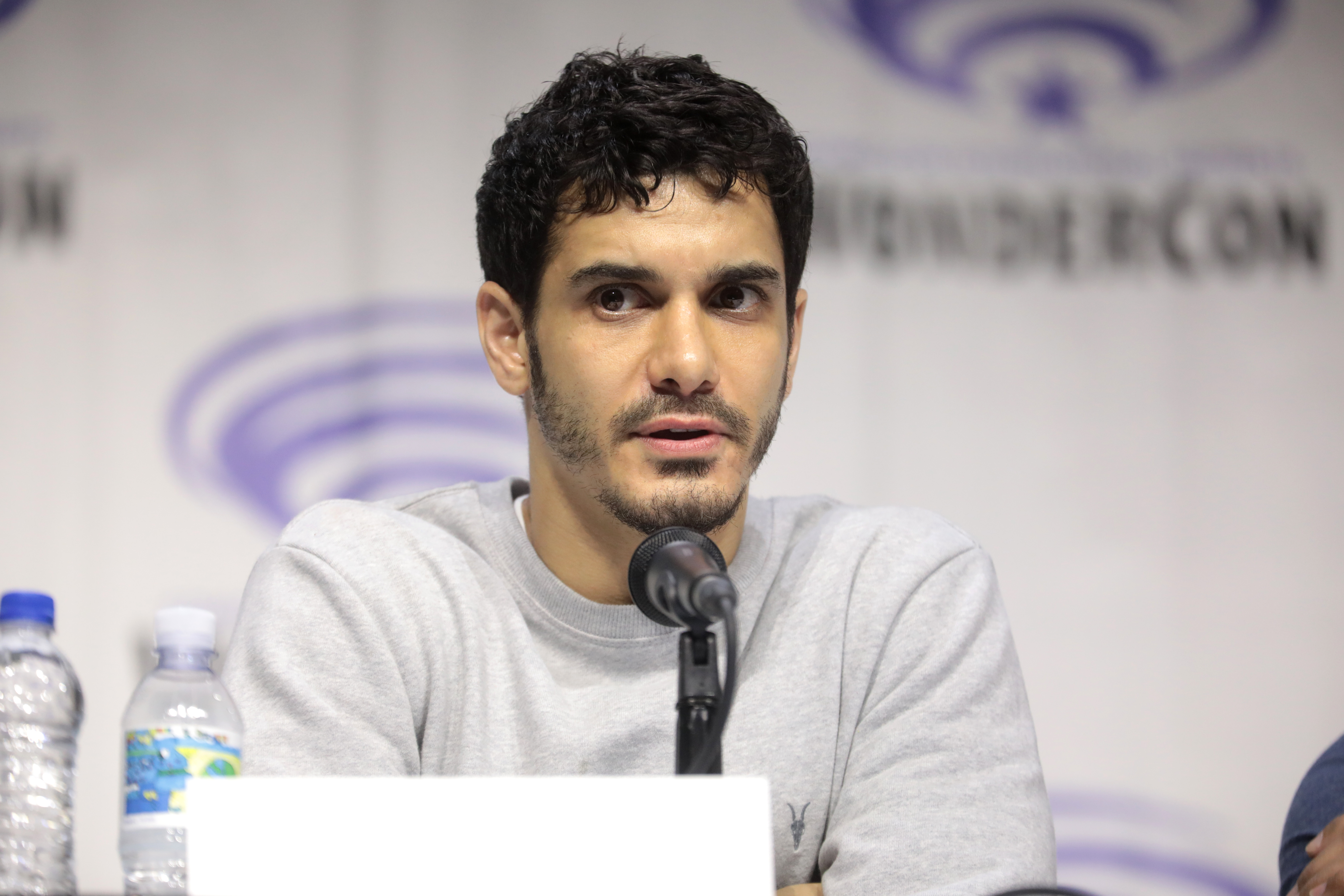
Elyes Gabel (Guppy Sandhu)

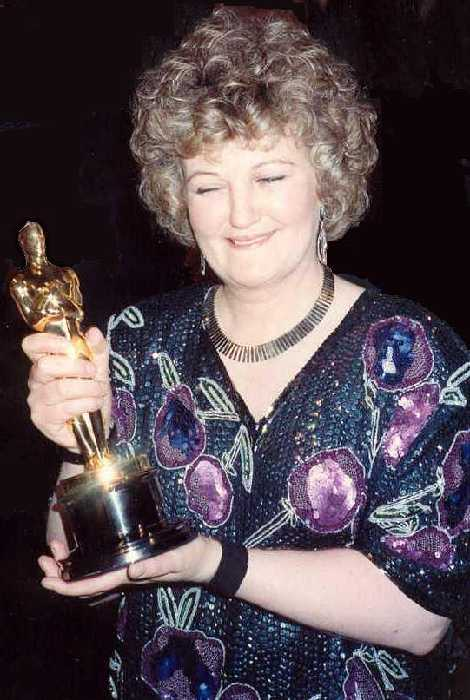
Brenda Fricker (Megan Roach)

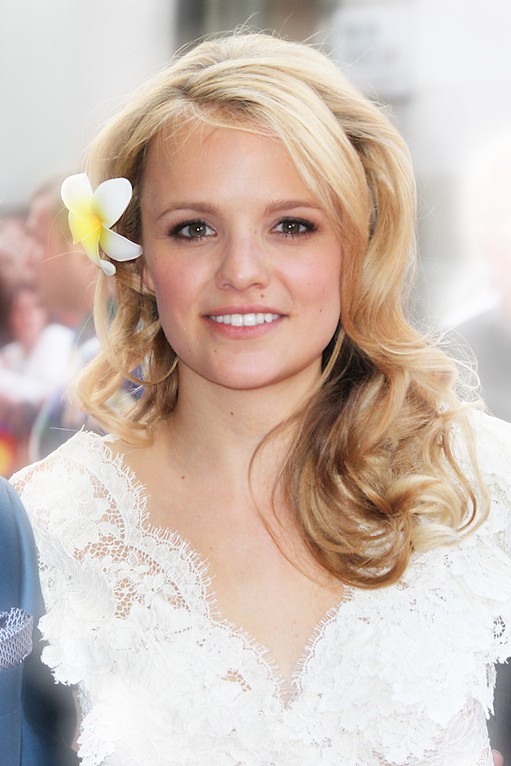
Laura Aikman (May Phelps)

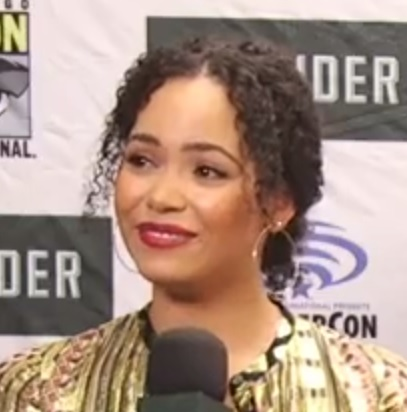
Madeleine Mantock (Scarlett Conway)

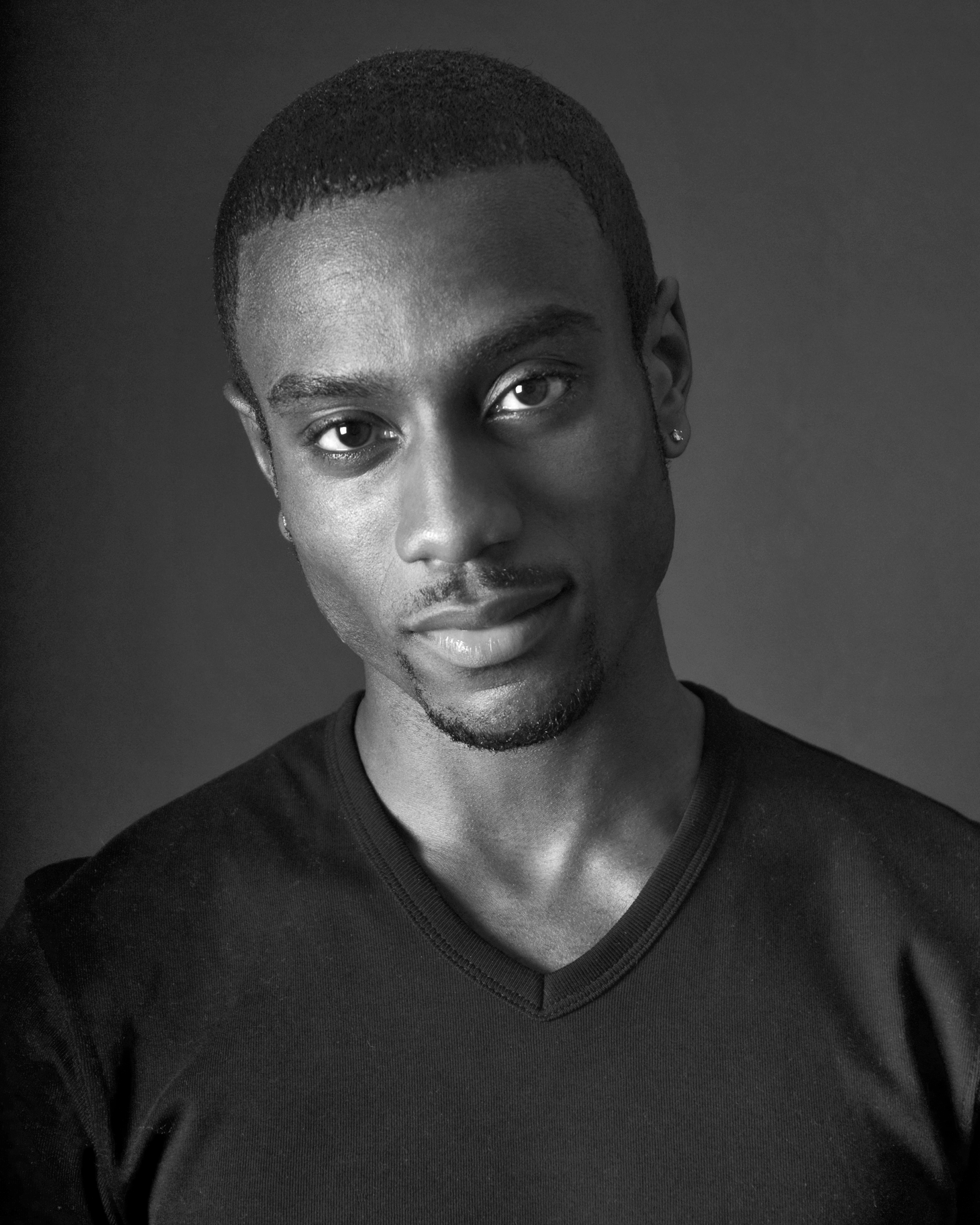
Michael Obiora (Lloyd Asike)

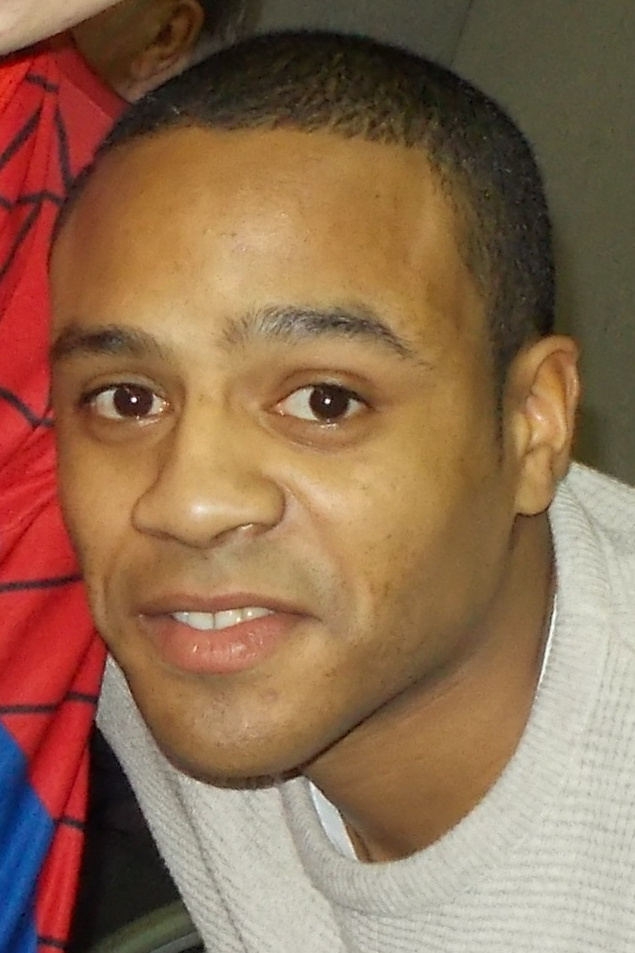
Daniel Anthony (Jamie Collier)

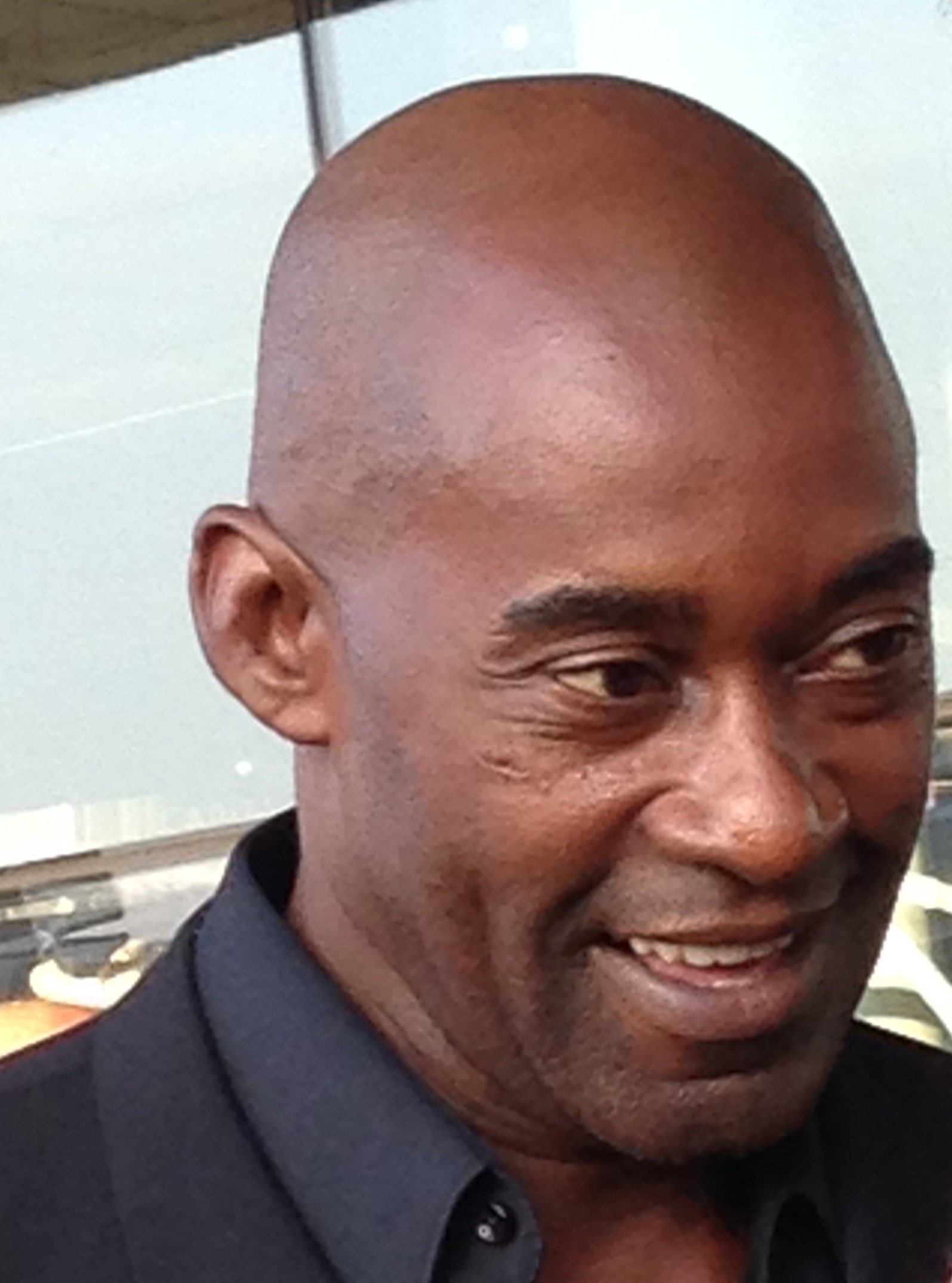
Patrick Robinson (Martin "Ash" Ashford)

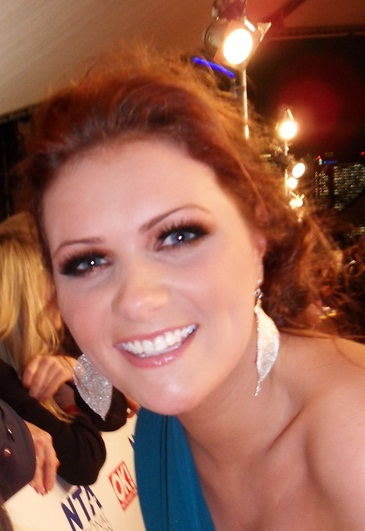
Chelsea Halfpenny (Alicia Munroe)

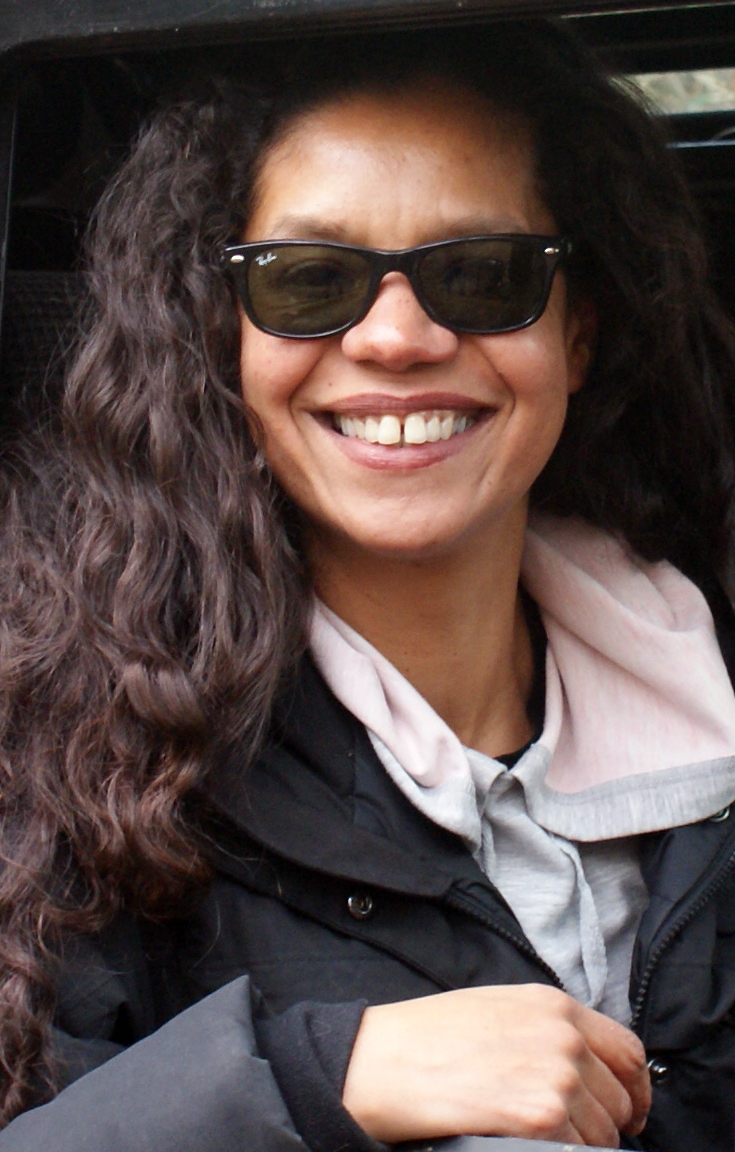
Jaye Griffiths (Elle Gardner)

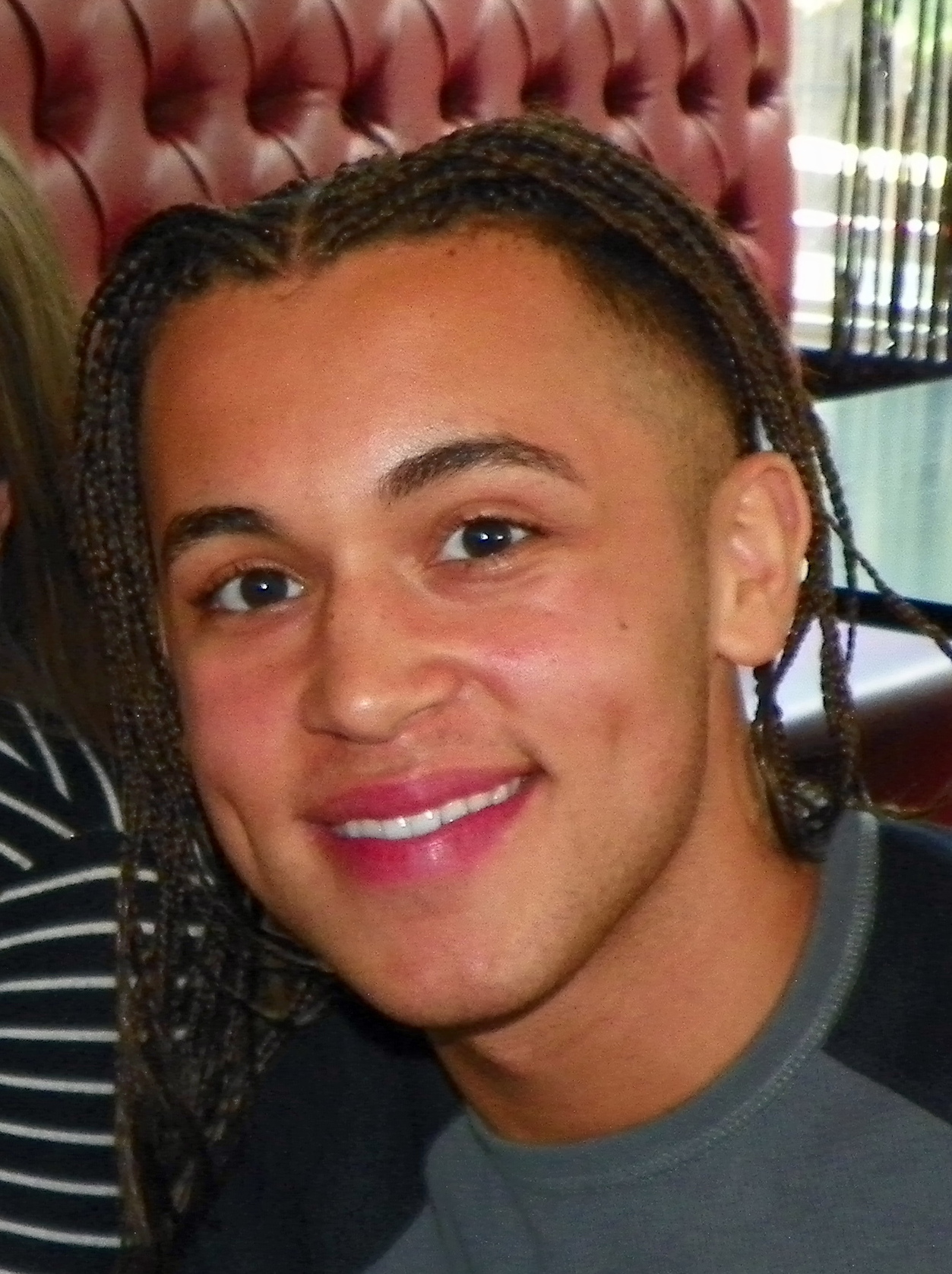
Shaheen Jafargholi (Marty Kirkby)

Character	Actor(s)	First appearance	Last appearance (Note: The original broadcast date of the character's last appearance.)	Ref.
Clive King	George Harris	6 September 1986	27 December 1986	
Sandra Mute	Lisa Bowerman	6 September 1986	3 October 1987	
Andrew Ponting	Robert Pugh	6 September 1986	17 October 1987	
Karen O'Malley	Kate Hardie	19 September 1987	14 November 1987	
Susie Mercer	Debbie Roza	6 September 1986	19 December 1987	
Elizabeth Starker	Maureen O'Brien	12 September 1987	19 December 1987	
Mary Tomlinson	Helena Little	12 September 1987	19 December 1987	
Ewart Plimmer	Bernard Gallagher	6 September 1986	7 October 1988	
Kuba Trzcinski	Christopher Rozycki	6 September 1986	4 November 1988	
Shirley Franklin	Ella Wilder	24 October 1987	4 November 1988	
Kiran Joghill	Shaheen Khan	9 September 1988	4 November 1988	
Alison McGrellis	Julie Graham	9 September 1988	4 November 1988	
David Rowe	Paul Lacoux	9 September 1988	4 November 1988	
Sadie Tomkins	Carol Leader	9 September 1988	4 November 1988	
Cyril James	Eddie Nestor	19 September 1987	1 December 1989	
Lucy Perry	Tom Hoskyns	8 September 1989	1 December 1989	
Valerie Sinclair	Susan Franklyn	9 September 1988	1 December 1989	
Alex Spencer	Belinda Davison	8 September 1989	1 December 1989	
Julie Stevens	Vivienne McKone	8 September 1989	1 December 1989	
Tony Walker	Eamon Boland	7 September 1990	9 November 1990	
Keith Cotterill	Geoffrey Leesley	24 October 1987	7 December 1990	
Helen Green	Maggie McCarthy	7 September 1990	7 December 1990	
Kelly Liddle	Adie Allen	6 September 1991	1 November 1991	
Trish Bayes	Maria Friedman	20 September 1991	27 February 1992	
Beth Ramanee	Mamta Kaash	7 September 1990	27 February 1992	
Jimmy Powell	Robson Green	8 September 1989	27 February 1992	
Kate Miller	Joanna Foster	12 September 1992	31 October 1992	
Julian Chapman	Nigel Le Vaillant	7 September 1990	19 December 1992	
Simon Eastman	Robert Daws	17 October 1992	27 February 1993	
Rob Khalefa	Jason Riddington	12 September 1992	27 February 1993	
Sandra Nicholl	Maureen Beattie	15 November 1991	27 February 1993	
Maxine Price	Emma Bird	12 September 1992	27 February 1993	
Norma Sullivan	Anne Kristen	6 September 1991	23 October 1993	
Ken Hodges	Christopher Guard	18 September 1993	30 October 1993	
Helen Chatsworth	Samantha Edmonds	25 September 1993	20 November 1993	
Mark Calder	Oliver Parker	18 September 1993	15 January 1994	
Brian Crawford	Brendan O'Hea	13 November 1993	22 January 1994	
Jane Scott	Caroline Webster	14 September 1990	26 February 1994	
Adele Beckford	Doña Croll	18 September 1993	26 February 1994	
Frankie Drummer	Steven O'Donnell	25 September 1993	26 February 1994	
Mary Skillett	Tara Moran	13 November 1993	26 February 1994	
Dave Masters	Martin Ball	26 December 1993	26 February 1994	
Mie Nisha-Kawa	Naoko Mori	25 September 1993	26 February 1994	
Eddie Gordon	Joan Oliver	17 September 1994	25 March 1995	
Adam Cooke	Steven Brand	17 September 1994	25 March 1995	
Peter Hayes	Robert Duncan	23 September 1995	27 January 1996	
Rachel Longworth	Jane Gurnett	1 January 1994	3 February 1996	
Laura Milburn	Lizzy McInnerny	7 October 1995	24 February 1996	
Daniel Perryman	Craig Kelly	16 September 1995	24 February 1996	
Gloria Hammond	Ganiat Kasuma	14 September 1996	22 February 1997	
Matt Hawley	Jason Merrells	17 September 1994	22 February 1997	
Jude Korcanik	Lisa Coleman	24 September 1994	22 February 1997	
Kate Wilson	Sorcha Cusack	17 September 1994	8 November 1997	
Jack Hathaway	Peter Birch	23 November 1996	15 November 1997	
Liz Harker	Sue Devaney	19 November 1994	22 November 1997	
Elliot Matthews	Peter Guinness	11 September 1997	28 February 1998	
Richard McCaig	Gray O'Brien	14 September 1996	28 February 1998	
Mark Grace	Paterson Joseph	11 September 1997	26 December 1998	
George Woodman	Rebecca Lacey	11 September 1997	13 March 1999	
Sam Colloby	Jonathan Kerrigan	21 September 1996	9 October 1999	
Derek "Sunny" Sunderland	Vincenzo Pellegrino	11 September 1997	23 October 1999	
Eve Montgomery	Barbara Marten	29 November 1997	30 October 1999	
Tina Seabrook	Claire Goose	11 September 1997	25 March 2000	
Adam Osman	Pal Aron	5 September 1998	15 October 2000	
Amy Howard	Rebecca Wheatley	11 September 1997	10 March 2001	
Mel Dyson	Michelle Butterly	6 November 1999	28 April 2001	
Tom Harvey	Kieron Forsyth	25 November 2000	28 April 2001	
Penny Hutchens	Donna Alexander	4 January 1997	28 April 2001	
Holly Miles	Sandra Huggett	18 September 1999	28 April 2001	
Dan Robinson	Grant Masters	16 September 2000	28 April 2001	
Andrew Bower	William Gaminara	8 September 1989	28 April 2001	
Andrew Bower	Philip Bretherton	8 September 1989	28 April 2001	
Barney Wolfe	Ronnie McCann	20 November 1999	28 April 2001	
Chloe Hill	Jan Anderson	5 September 1998	19 January 2002	
Patrick Spiller	Ian Kelsey	11 December 1999	16 March 2002	
Max Gallagher	Robert Gwilym	5 September 1998	18 May 2002	
Spencer	Ben Keaton	18 December 1999	29 June 2002	
Jan Goddard	Judy Loe	29 September 2001	9 November 2002	
Colette Griffiths	Adjoa Andoh	16 September 2000	7 June 2003	
Dillon Cahill	Dan Rymer	15 September 2001	21 June 2003	
Jack Vincent	Will Mellor	24 March 2001	21 June 2003	
Tony Vincent	Lee Warburton	24 November 2001	21 June 2003	
Anna Paul	Zita Sattar	3 March 2001	20 September 2003	
Baz Wilder	Julia Watson	6 September 1986	10 January 2004	
Tally Harper	Ashlie Walker	14 September 2002	1 May 2004	
Tally Harper	Holly Davidson	14 September 2002	1 May 2004	
Nikki Marshall	Kelly Harrison	15 September 2001	17 July 2004	
Simon Kaminski	Christopher Colquhoun	23 March 2002	28 August 2004	
Lara Stone	Christine Stephen-Daly	29 September 2001	28 August 2004	
Roxy Bird	Loo Brealey	13 April 2002	18 September 2004	
Finlay "Fin" Newton	Kwame Kwei-Armah	6 November 1999	2 October 2004	
Jim Brodie	Maxwell Caulfield	14 September 2003	26 December 2004	
Bex Reynolds	Sarah Manners	8 February 2003	30 July 2005	
Claire Guildford	Leanne Wilson	20 September 2003	20 August 2005	
Woody Joyner	Will Thorp	4 December 2004	24 December 2005	
Bruno Jenkins	Mark Bonnar	10 September 2005	11 February 2006	
Luke Warren	Matthew Wait	19 April 2003	27 May 2006	
Nina Farr	Rebekah Gibbs	24 July 2004	26 August 2006	
Sean Maddox	Gerald Kyd	5 September 1998	18 November 2006	
Ellen Zitek	Georgina Bouzova	18 September 2004	24 December 2006	
Selena Donovan	Elizabeth Carling	1 March 2003	4 August 2007	
Theo "Stitch" Lambert	Peter O'Brien	18 March 2007	4 August 2007	
Cyd Pike	Joanne King	18 September 2006	15 September 2007	
Guppy Sandhu	Elyes Gabel	23 October 2004	29 September 2007	
Nathan Spencer	Ben Price	17 December 2005	6 October 2007	
Nadia Talianos	Daphne Alexander	24 February 2007	30 December 2007	
Greg Fallon	Kip Gamblin	10 June 2006	26 January 2008	
Harry Harper	Simon MacCorkindale	8 June 2002	8 March 2008	
Snezana Lalovic	Ivana Bašić	16 February 2008	28 March 2009	
Kelsey Phillips	Janine Mellor	6 August 2005	28 March 2009	
Curtis Cooper	Abdul Salis	1 March 2008	1 August 2009	
Toby De Silva	Matthew Needham	8 September 2007	19 September 2009	
Jessica Harrison	Gillian Kearney	12 January 2008	8 May 2010	
Megan Roach	Brenda Fricker	6 September 1986	7 August 2010	
May Phelps	Laura Aikman	12 September 2009	14 August 2010	
Yuki Reid	Will Sharpe	12 September 2009	2 January 2011	
Polly Emmerson	Sophia Di Martino	19 March 2009	30 April 2011	
Kirsty Clements	Lucy Gaskell	15 May 2010	30 July 2011	
Adam Trueman	Tristan Gemmill	15 September 2007	6 August 2011	
Madiha "Mads" Durrani	Hasina Haque	4 September 2010	6 September 2011	
Ruth Winters	Georgia Taylor	8 September 2007	10 December 2011	
Scarlett Conway	Madeleine Mantock	20 August 2011	22 July 2012	
Nick Jordan	Michael French	21 November 1998	2 February 2013	
Aoife O'Reilly	Gemma-Leah Devereux	5 January 2013	27 April 2013	
Linda Andrews	Christine Tremarco	16 January 2010	11 May 2013	
Lloyd Asike	Michael Obiora	20 August 2011	8 June 2013	
Tom Kent	Oliver Coleman	7 January 2012	14 December 2013	
Jeff Collier	Matt Bardock	10 February 2007	4 October 2014	
Jamie Collier	Daniel Anthony	5 January 2013	11 October 2014	
Martin "Ash" Ashford	Patrick Robinson	7 September 1990	13 December 2014	
Maggie Coldwell	Susan Cookson	29 January 2005	28 March 2015	
Sam Bateman	Luke Bailey	2 October 2004	15 August 2015	
Rita Freeman	Chloe Howman	10 August 2013	16 July 2016	
Mike Barratt	Clive Mantle	23 January 1993	27 August 2016	
Comfort Jones	Martina Laird	15 September 2001	27 August 2016	
Abs Denham	James Redmond	4 October 2003	27 August 2016	
Alice Chantrey	Sam Grey	15 April 2006	27 August 2016	
Jay Faldren	Ben Turner	25 October 2008	27 August 2016	
Lenny Lyons	Steven Miller	12 September 2009	27 August 2016	
Lofty Chiltern	Lee Mead	1 March 2014	17 June 2017	
Jez Andrews	Lloyd Everitt	12 March 2016	26 August 2017	
Lily Chao	Crystal Yu	3 August 2013	4 November 2017	
Max Walker	Jamie Davis	5 October 2013	13 January 2018	
Bea Kinsella	Michelle Fox	3 February 2018	4 August 2018	
Sam Nicholls	Charlotte Salt	15 October 2011	11 August 2018	
Alicia Munroe	Chelsea Halfpenny	19 September 2015	19 January 2019	
Louise Tyler	Azuka Oforka	1 October 2011	16 February 2019	
Elle Gardner	Jaye Griffiths	7 May 2016	25 May 2019	
Gemma Dean	Rebecca Ryan	21 January 2017	10 August 2019	
Kathleen "Dixie" Dixon	Jane Hazlegrove	30 September 2006	21 September 2019	
Mason Reede	Victor Oshin	24 August 2019	28 December 2019	
Lisa "Duffy" Duffin	Cathy Shipton	6 September 1986	1 February 2020	
Archie Hudson	Genesis Lynea	23 March 2019	7 March 2020	
Ruby Spark	Maddy Hill	14 July 2018	18 April 2020	
Will Noble	Jack Nolan	30 March 2019	16 January 2021	
Connie Beauchamp	Amanda Mealing	26 December 2004	3 April 2021	
Leon Cook	Bobby Lockwood	9 January 2021	1 May 2021	
Lev Malinovsky	Uriel Emil	28 September 2019	7 August 2021	
Fenisha Khatri	Olivia D'Lima	22 February 2020	7 August 2021	
Mackenzie "Big Mac" Chalker	Charles Dale	24 November 2007	14 August 2021	
Noel Garcia	Tony Marshall	5 January 2008	14 August 2021	
Caleb "Cal" Knight	Richard Winsor	18 January 2014	21 August 2021	
Jade Lovall	Gabriella Leon	3 November 2018	18 September 2021	
Christina "Tina" Mollett	Adele James	25 July 2020	9 October 2021	
Tess Bateman	Suzanne Packer	13 September 2003	11 December 2021	
Rosa Cadenas	Jacey Sallés	27 July 2019	19 March 2022	
Adrian "Fletch" Fletcher	Alex Walkinshaw	7 July 2012	2 April 2022	
Matthew Afolami	Osi Okerafor	29 May 2021	24 April 2022	
Robyn Miller	Amanda Henderson	5 January 2013	18 March 2023	
David Hide	Jason Durr	30 April 2016	18 March 2023	
Marty Kirkby	Shaheen Jafargholi	17 November 2018	18 March 2023	
Donna Jackson	Jaye Jacobs	26 December 2004	16 September 2023	
Ryan Firth	Eddie-Joe Robinson	8 April 2023	6 January 2024	
Sah Brockner	Arin Smethurst	9 October 2021	13 January 2024	
Paige Allcott	Shalisha James-Davis	8 January 2022	24 February 2024	
Max Cristie	Nigel Harman	18 February 2023	2 March 2024	
Zoe Hanna	Sunetra Sarker	29 December 2007	16 March 2024	
Josh Griffiths	Ian Bleasdale	8 September 1989	16 March 2024	
Patrick Onley	Jamie Glover	23 March 2024	8 June 2024	
Tariq Hussein	Manpreet Bachu	24 February 2024	22 March 2025	
Ngozi Okoye	Adesuwa Oni	6 January 2024	17 January 2026	
Kim Chang	Jasmine Bayes	10 January 2026	18 April 2026	
Charlie Fairhead	Derek Thompson	6 September 1986	5 September 2026	
Ethan Hardy	George Rainsford	11 January 2014	5 September 2026	
Sophia Peters	Kellie Shirley	15 June 2024	5 September 2026	

=== Recurring characters ===
Former Casualty cast

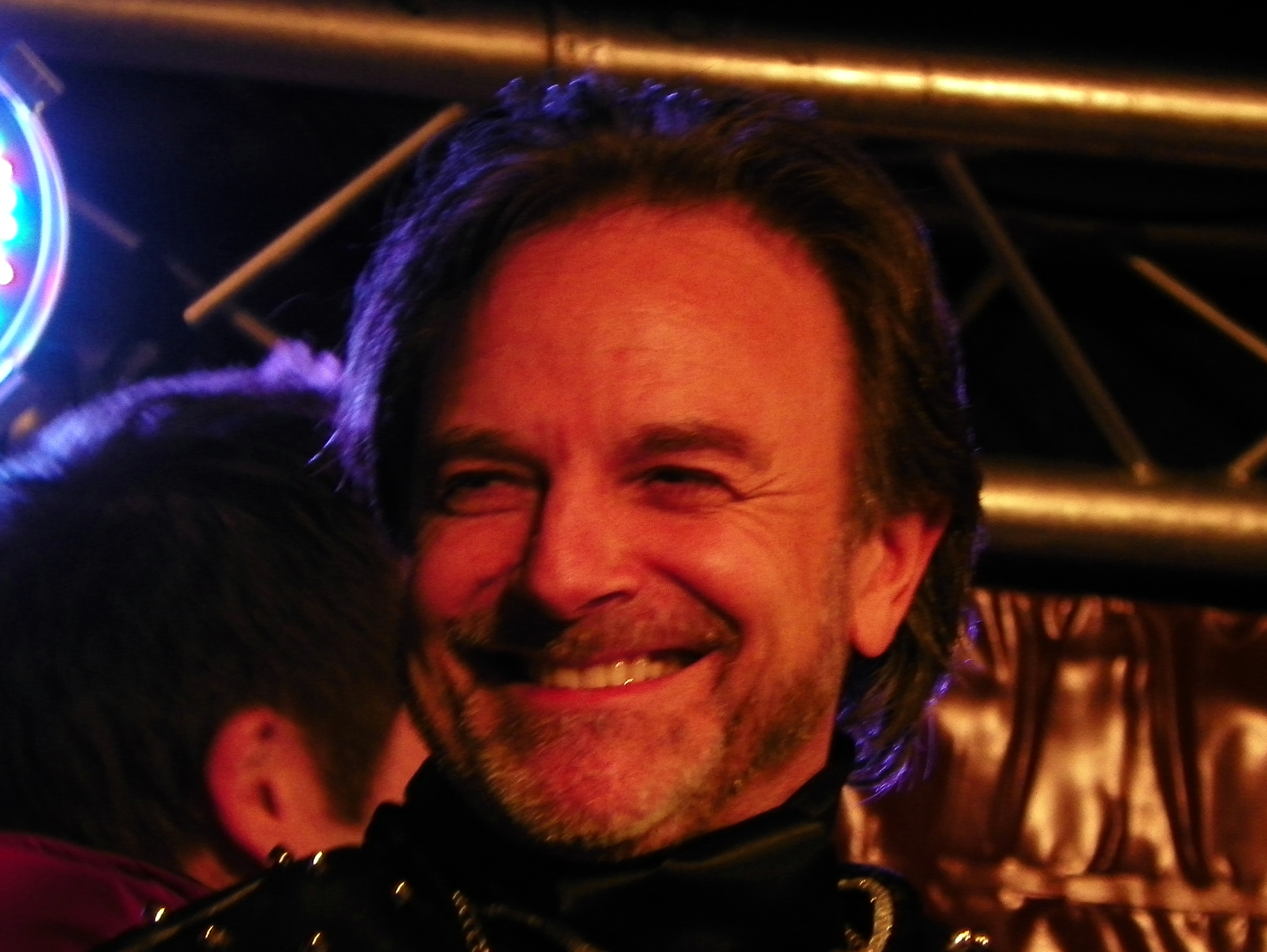
Brian Capron (Peter)

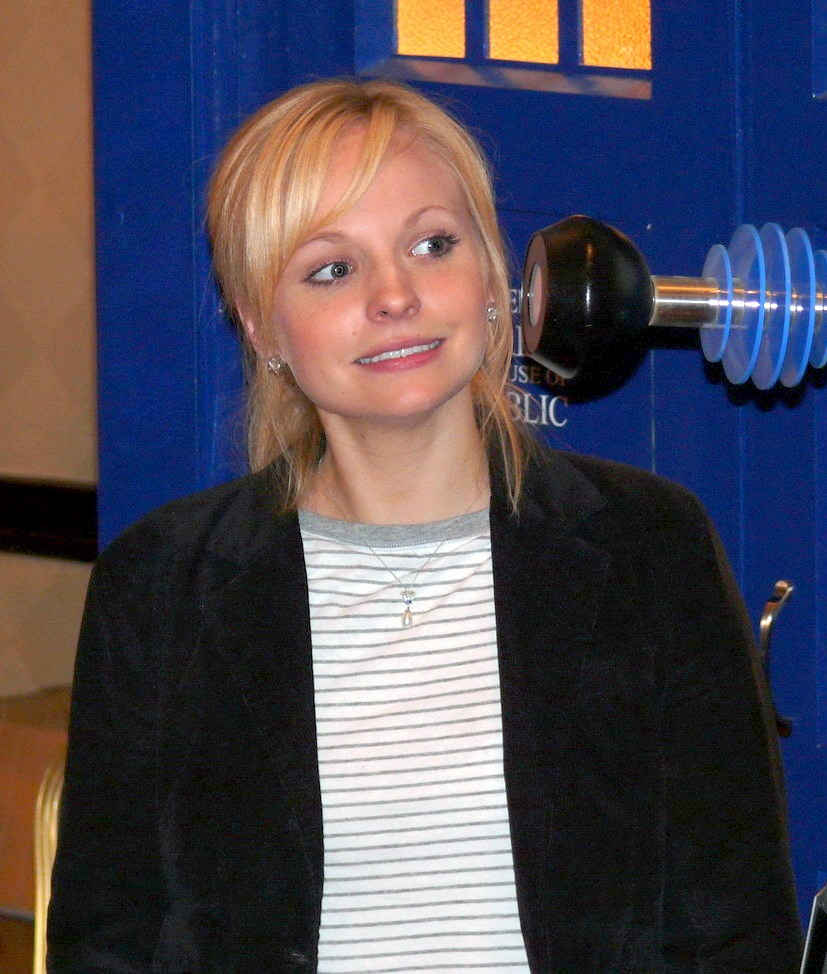
Georgia Moffett (Heather Whitefield)

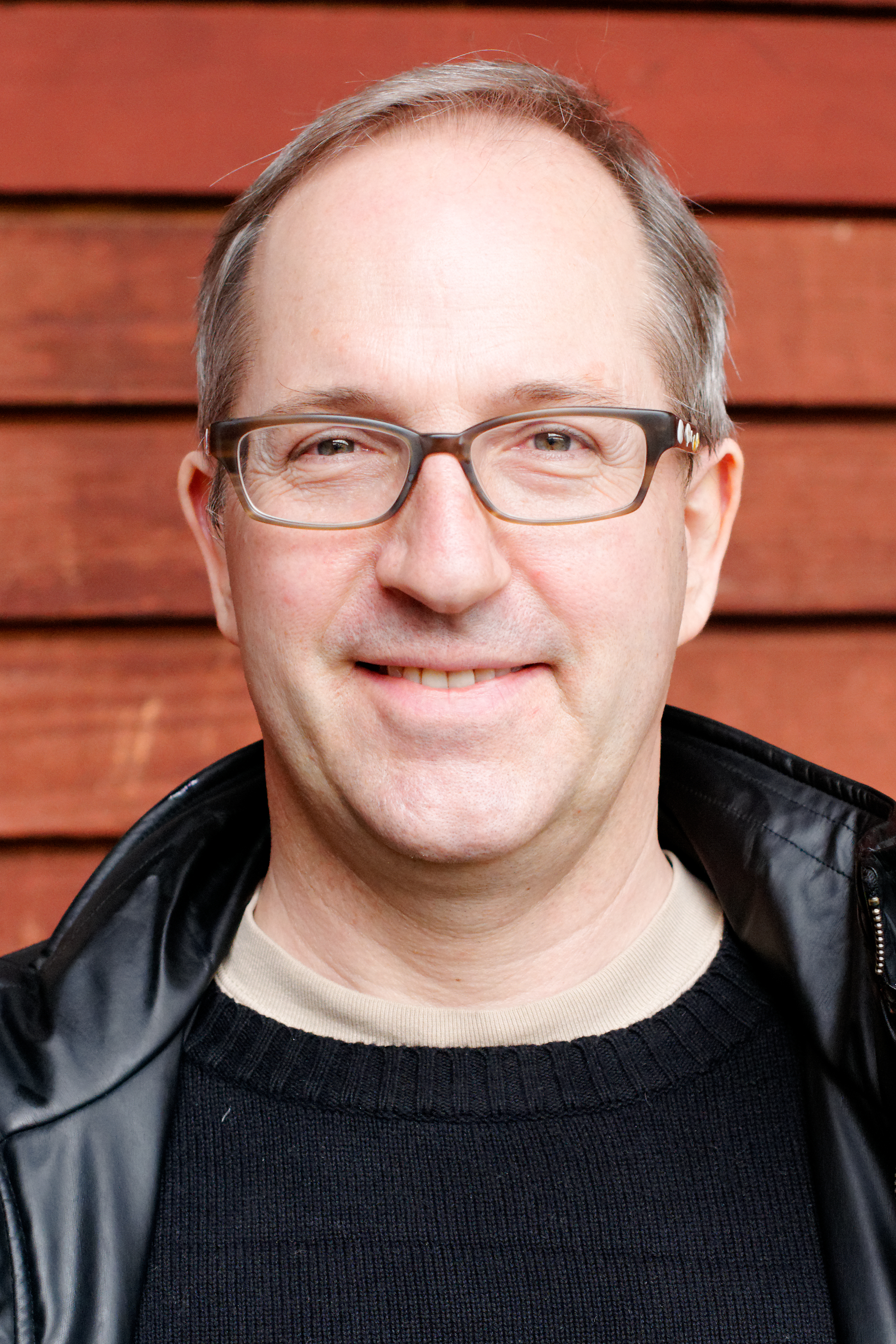
Michael Maloney (Howard Fairfax)

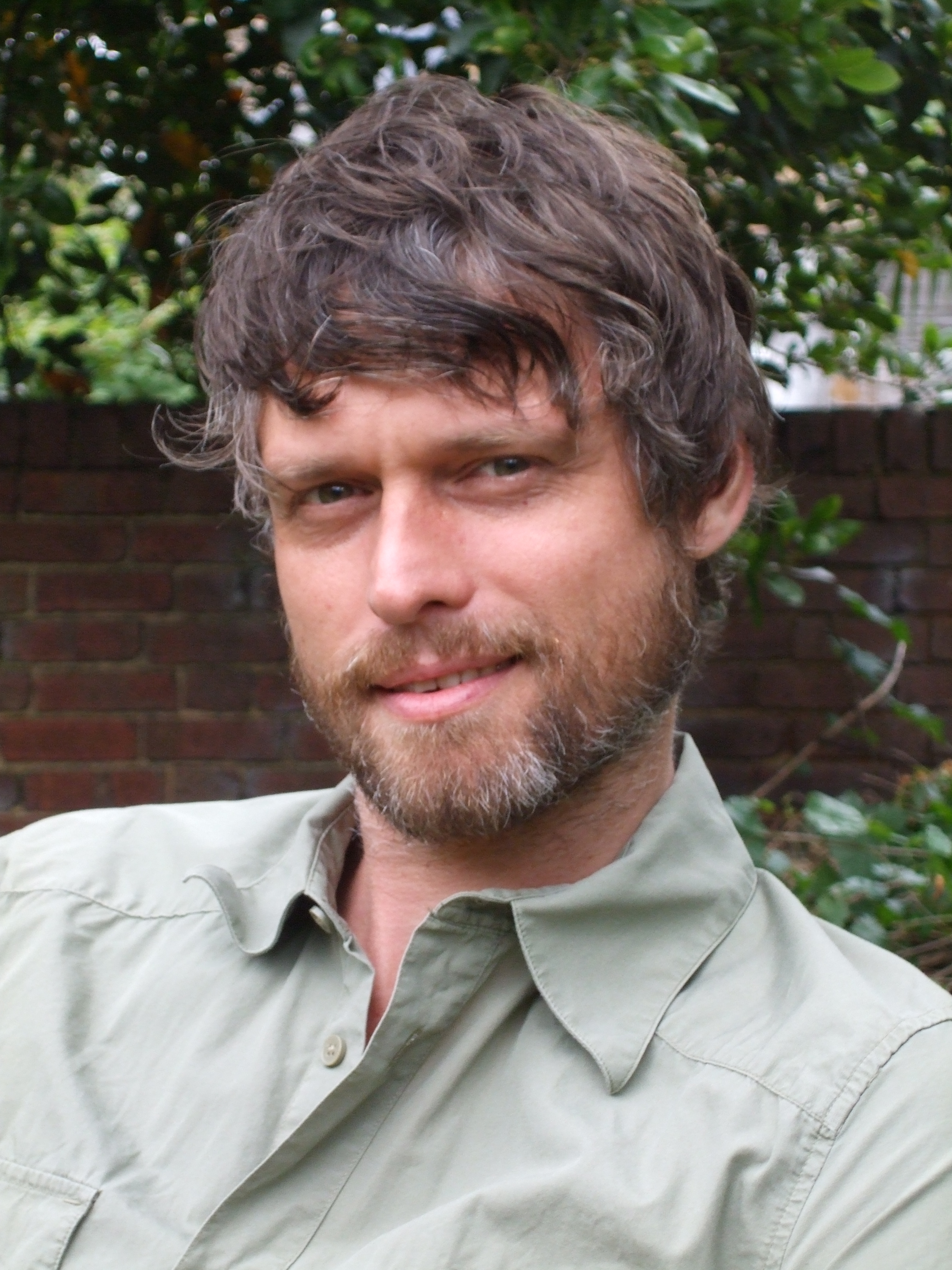
Stephen Billington (Edward Thurlow)

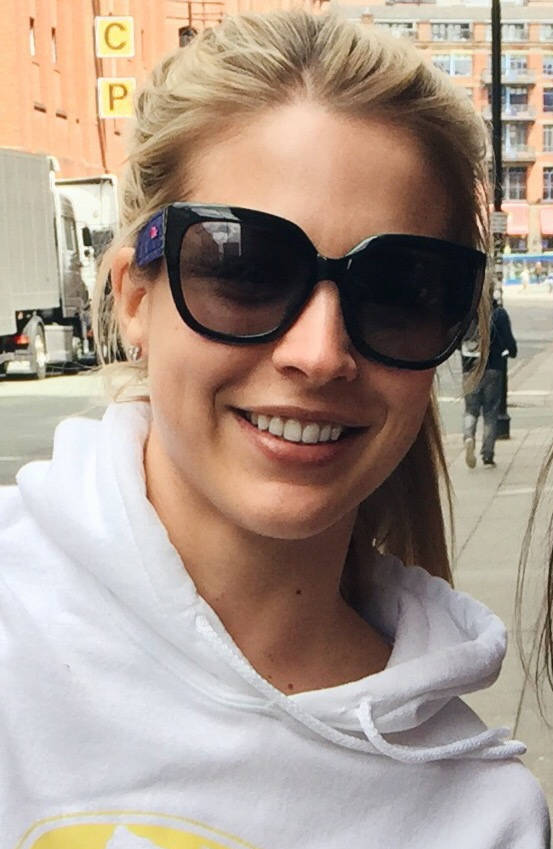
Gemma Atkinson (Tamzin Bayle)

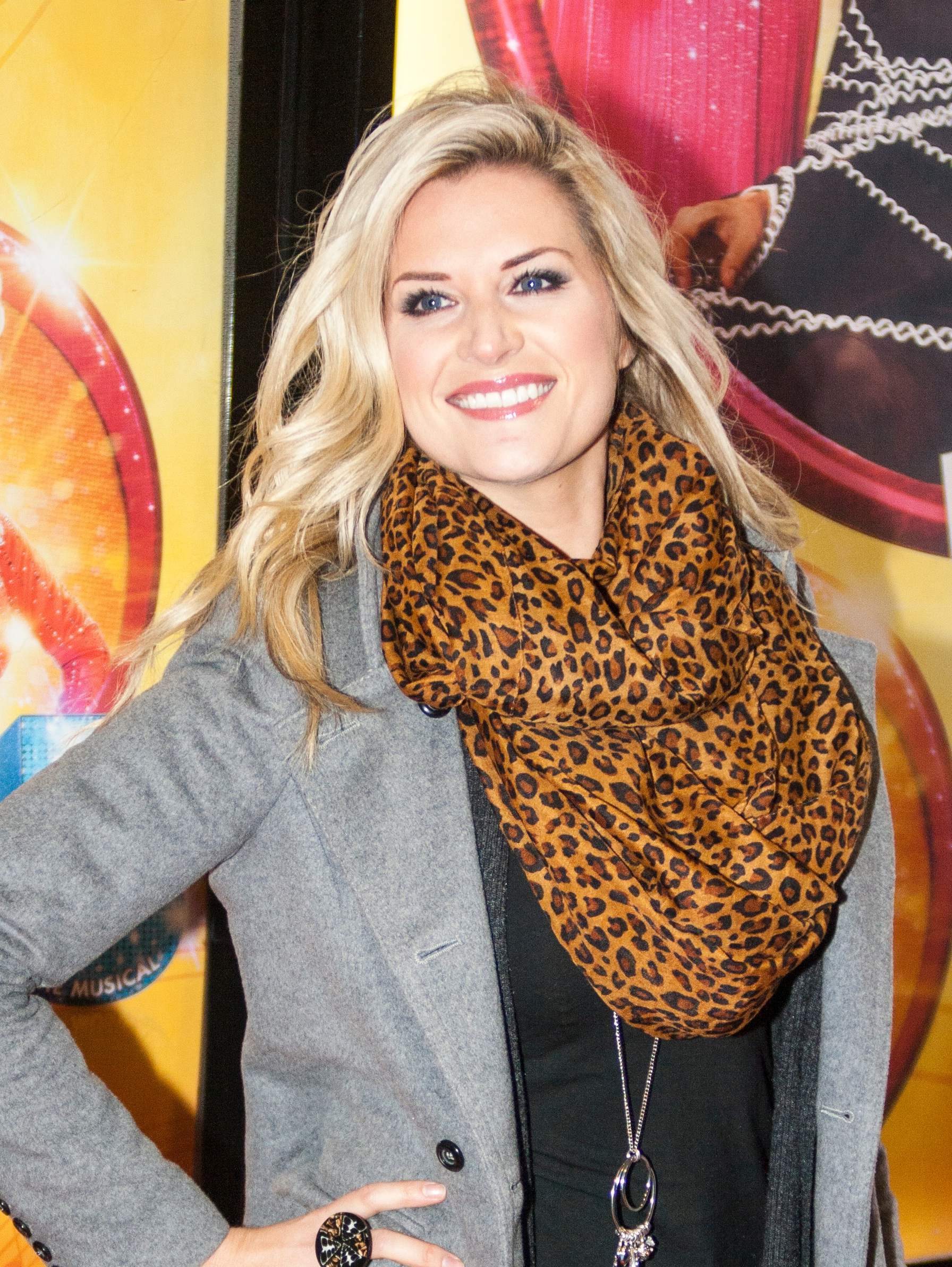
Sarah Jayne Dunn (Taylor Ashbie)

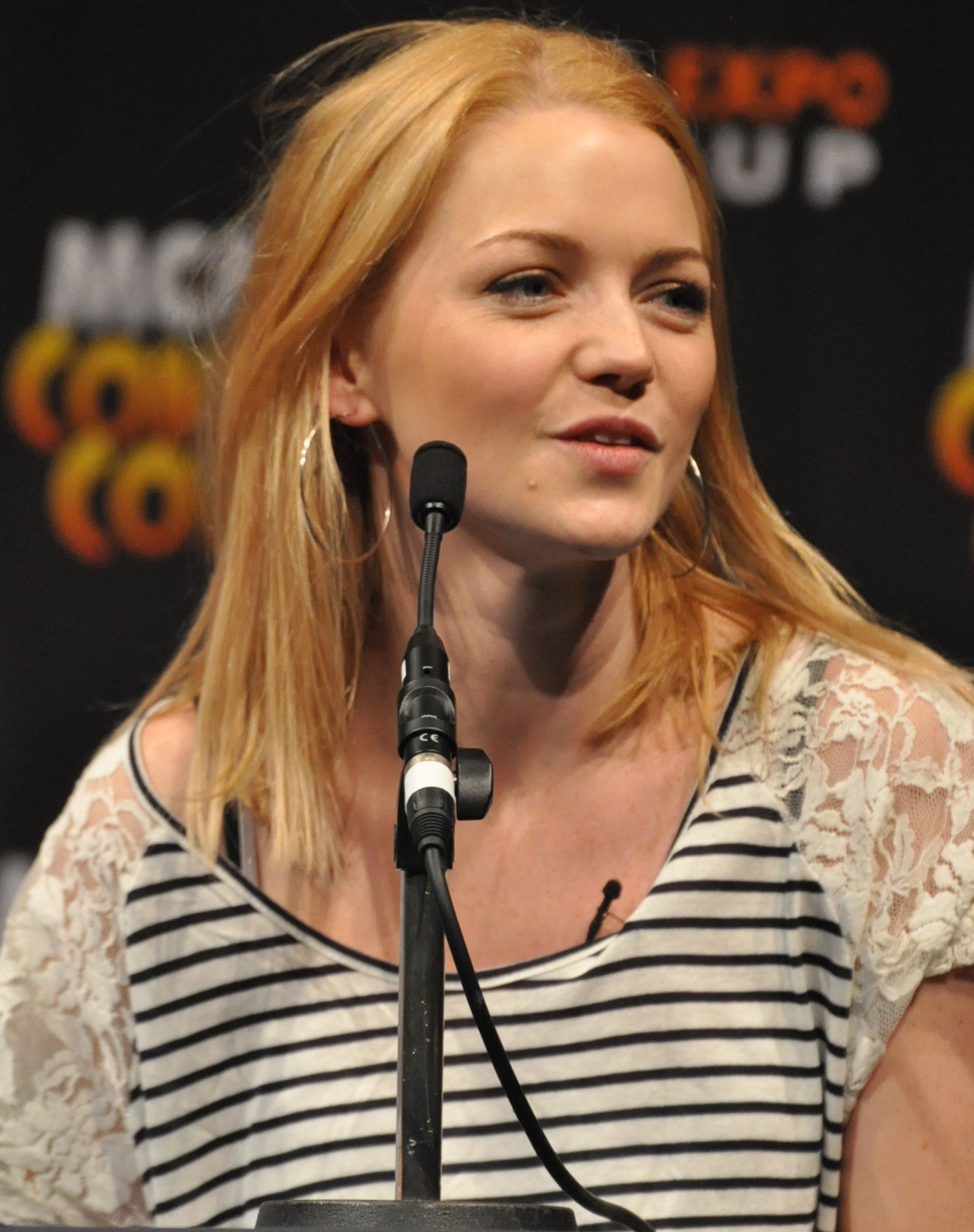
Hannah Spearritt (Mercedes Christie)

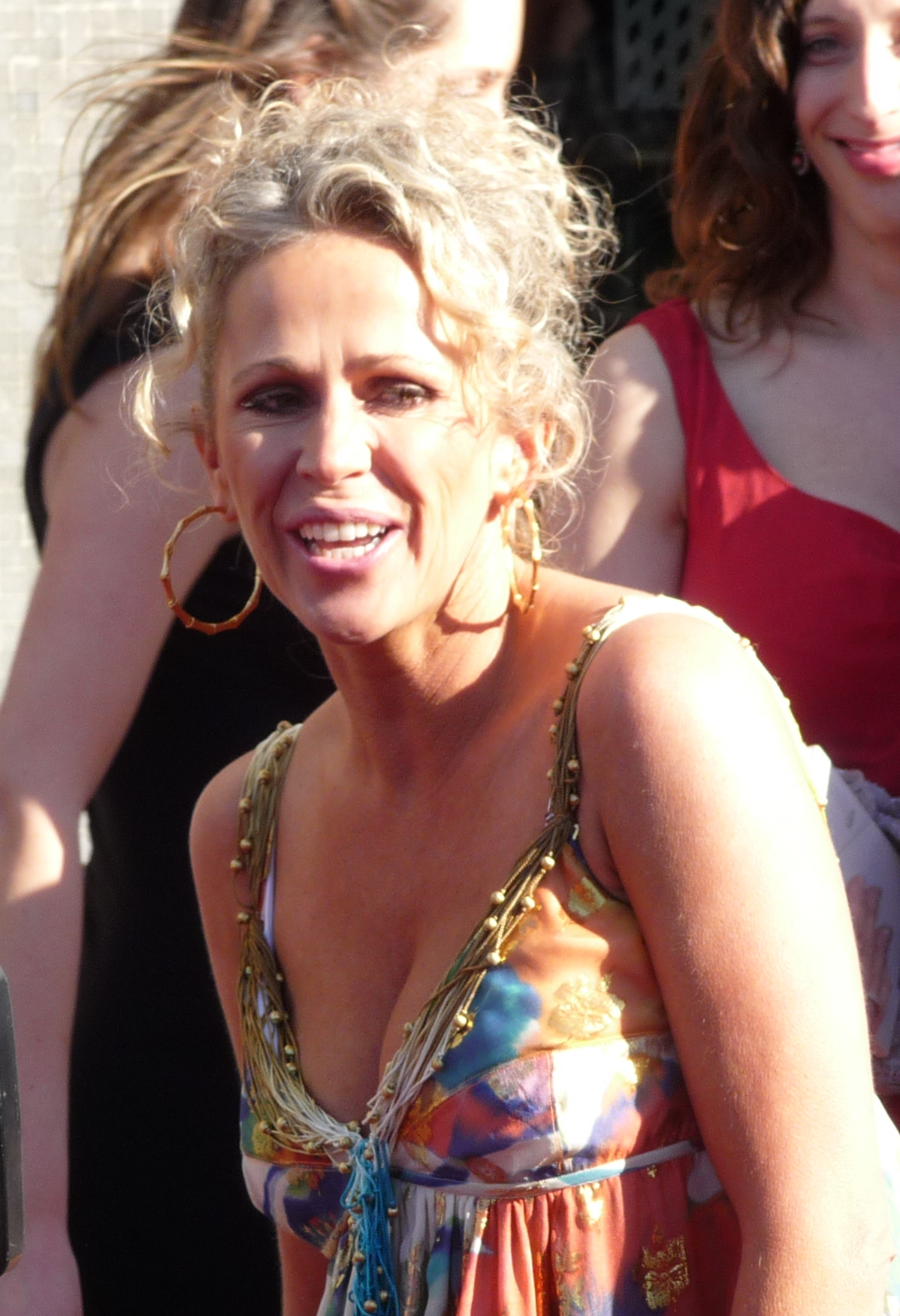
Lucy Benjamin (Denise Ellisson)

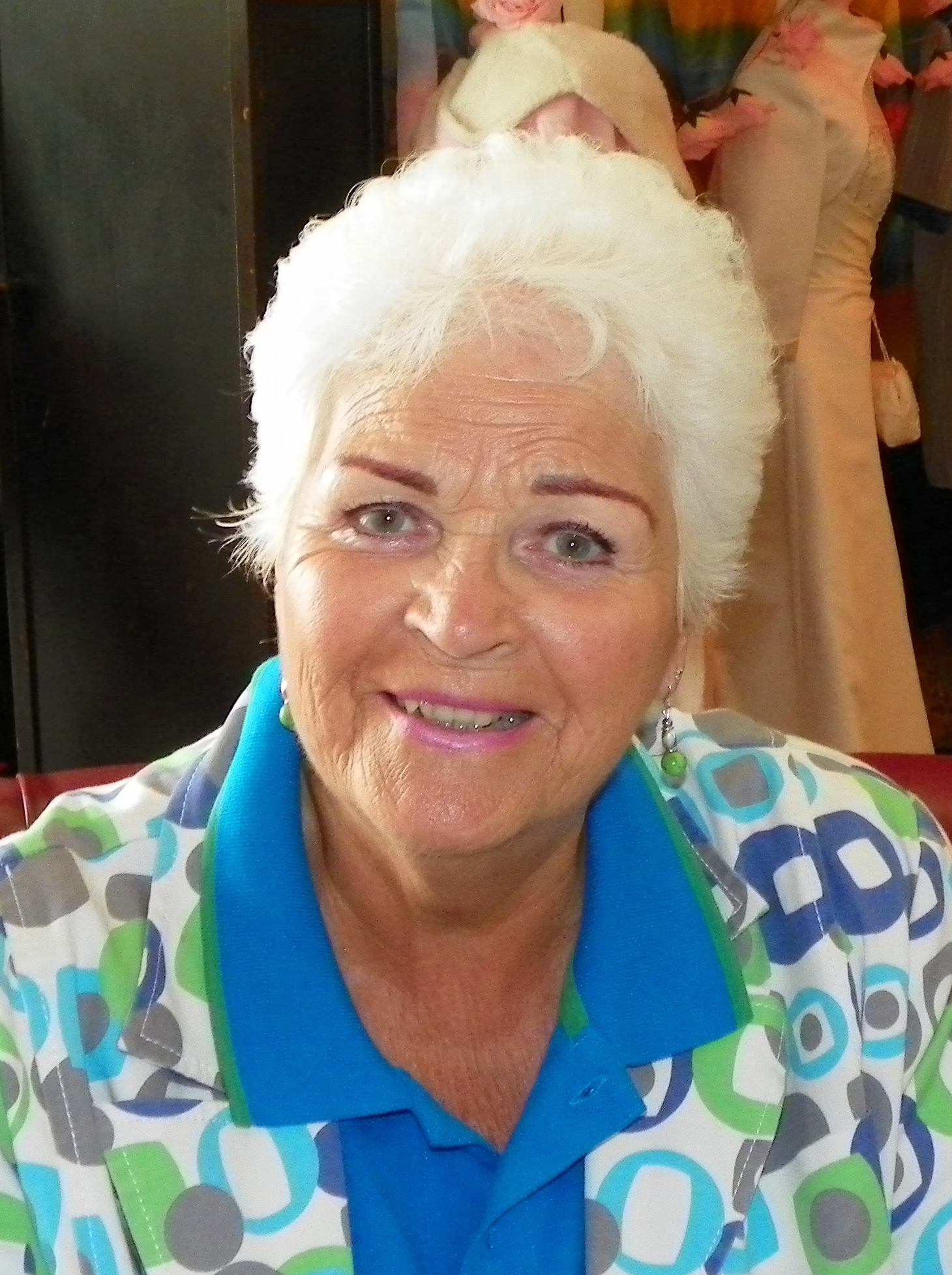
Pam St. Clement (Sally Hodge)

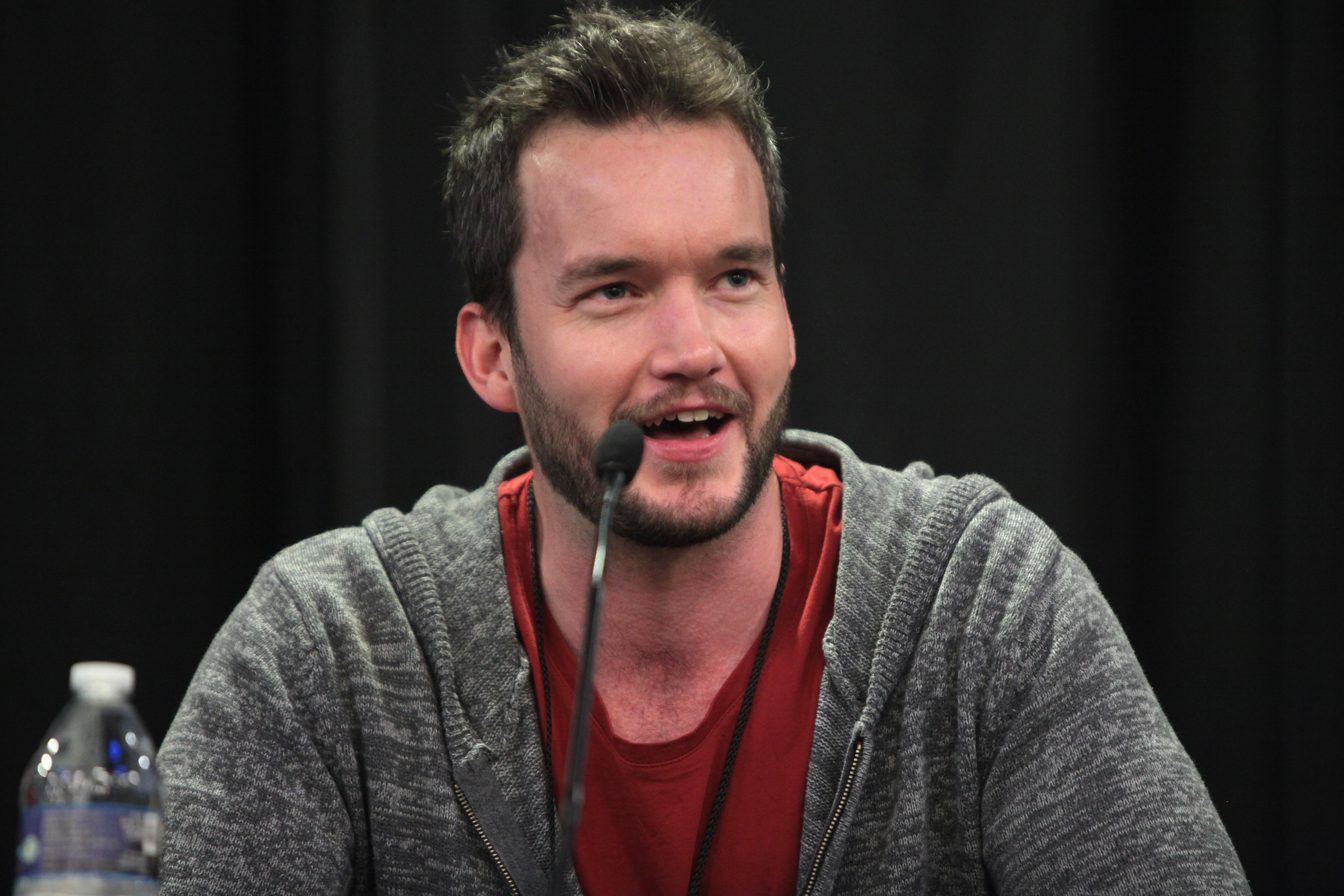
Gareth David-Lloyd (Joshua Bowers)

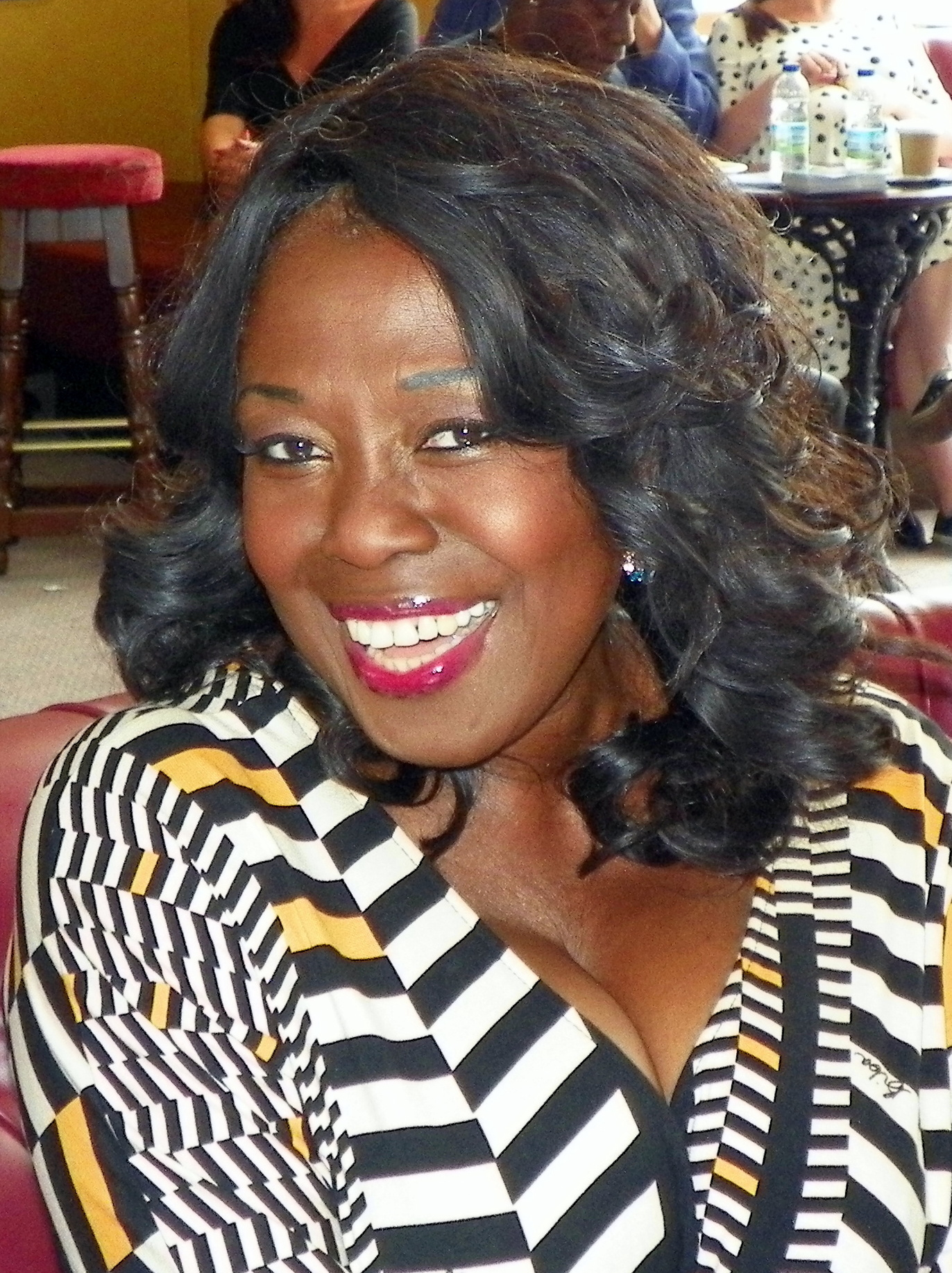
Ellen Thomas (Omo Masters)

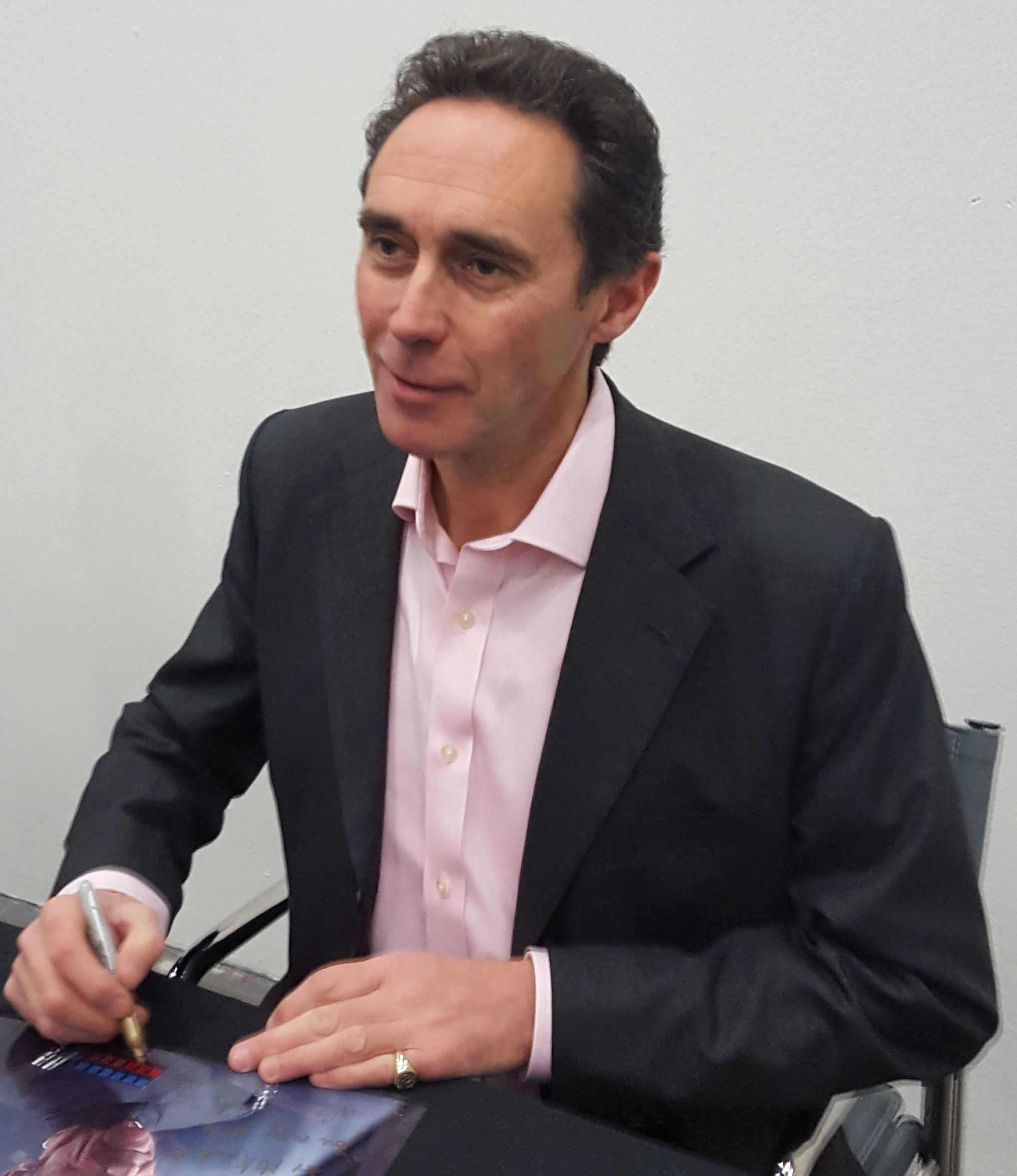
Guy Henry (Henrik Hanssen)

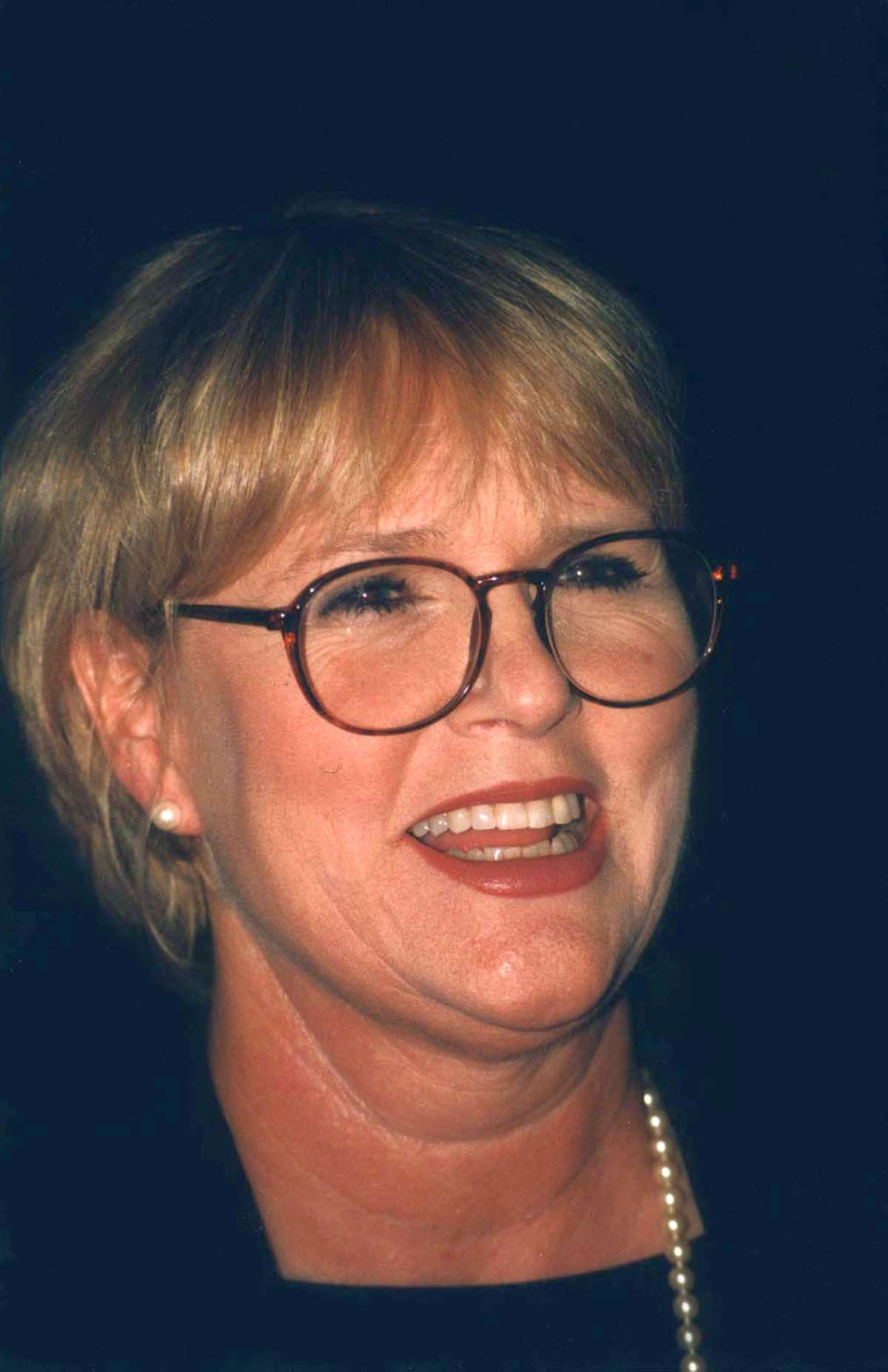
Sharon Gless (Zsa Zsa Harper-Jenkinson)

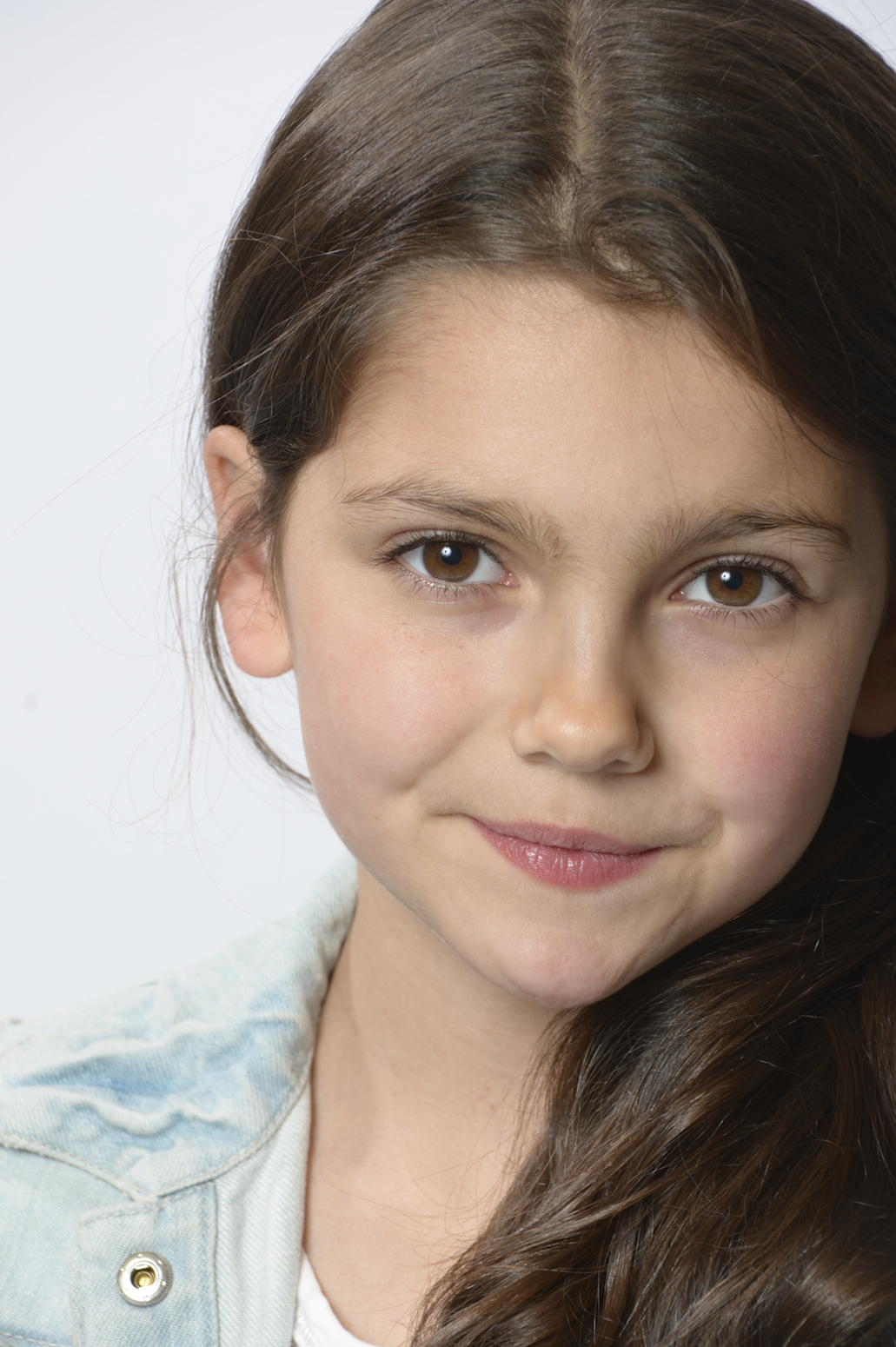
Emily Carey (Grace Beauchamp-Strachan)

Character	Actor(s)	First appearance	Last appearance	Ref.
Clare Wainwright	Stella Gonet	27 September 1986	18 October 1986	
Rupert Thalton	James Snell	27 September 1986	18 October 1986	
Francine O'Dwyer	Alison Deegan	22 November 1986	19 December 1987	
Peter	Brian Capron	23 September 1988	21 October 1988	
Lily	Susan Colverd	8 September 1989	9 November 1990	
Jenny	Nicola Jeffries	10 October 1992	5 December 1992	
Claire Fuller	Toni-Sue Burley	24 December 1992	27 March 1993	
Ozzy	Michael Jenner	7 September 1990	23 October 1993	
Tom Harley	David Ryall	20 November 1993	11 December 1993	
Karen Goodliffe	Suzanna Hamilton	18 September 1993	8 January 1994	
Lucy Cooper	Jo Unwin	27 February 1992	26 February 1994	
Chris Culham	Kevin Dyer	20 February 1993	24 February 1996	
Vicki	Maggie Lynskey	7 September 1990	24 February 1996	
Trevor Wilson	Michael N. Harbour	30 September 1995	16 November 1996	
David Sinclair	Vas Blackwood	1 February 1997	22 February 1997	
Monica	Soo Drouet	14 September 1996	20 September 1997	
James Roberts	Bryan Murray	21 November 1998	16 January 1999	
Pat Garratt	Ian Kershaw	12 September 1998	6 March 1999	
Julie Day	Susan Cookson	5 September 1998	25 March 2000	
Rachel James	Amy Robbins	15 September 2001	22 December 2001	
Philippa Kinross	Fiona Gillies	15 December 2001	12 January 2002	
Gilly	Emily Dormer	16 February 2002	30 March 2002	
Heather Lincoln	Nicole Faraday	21 September 2002	16 November 2002	
Jeff McGuire	Bob Mason	15 September 2001	1 March 2003	
Chris Meredith	Michael Praed	13 April 2002	3 May 2003	
Merlin Jameson	Orlando Seale	4 January 2003	20 September 2003	
Merlin Jameson	Sebastian Dunn	4 January 2003	20 September 2003	
Will Manning	Gary Mavers	11 September 2004	1 October 2005	
Colin Evans	Peter Silverleaf	3 January 2004	1 October 2005	
Mike Bateman	Louis Emerick	13 September 2003	19 August 2006	
Terence "T.C." Clarkson	Peter England	22 September 2007	1 December 2007	
Simon Tanner	Paul Fox	31 May 2008	9 August 2008	
Marilyn Fox	Caroline Langrishe	22 September 2007	15 November 2008	
Heather Whitefield	Georgia Moffett	12 September 2009	13 September 2009	
Dawn	Kelly Marie Walters	12 September 2009	28 November 2009	
Paul Bridges	Conleth Kane	12 September 2009	27 December 2009	
Sean Anderson	Richard Dillane	1 March 2008	16 January 2010	
Eve	Kate Edney	12 September 2009	6 February 2010	
Gareth	Derek Barr	12 September 2009	6 February 2010	
Frances Lively	Josette Simon	11 April 2009	10 April 2010	
Howard Fairfax	Michael Maloney	27 February 2010	17 April 2010	
Kieron Fletcher	Robert Boulter	20 February 2010	1 May 2010	
Matt Strong	Raymond Coulthard	20 February 2010	1 May 2010	
Robert Ludlow	Alec Newman	15 May 2010	21 August 2010	
Edward Thurlow	Stephen Billington	5 June 2010	27 December 2010	
James Molloy	Travis Oliver	23 October 2010	27 December 2010	
Sarah Evans	Julia St. John	24 December 2006	2 April 2011	
Miriam Turner	Cheryl Campbell	19 February 2011	7 May 2011	
Henry Williams	Tom Chadbon	13 September 2008	28 May 2011	
Omar Nasri	Dhaffer L'Abidine	13 August 2011	1 October 2011	
Denise Andrews	Kate McEvoy	21 January 2012	6 October 2012	
Britney Andrews	Devon Beigan	21 January 2012	6 October 2012	
Joe Andrews	Taylor Perry	21 January 2012	6 October 2012	
Amanda Franks	Connie Fisher	7 April 2012	1 December 2012	
Dominic Carter	Gary Cady	1 December 2012	15 December 2012	
Ally Hunter	Rebecca Newman	5 January 2013	12 January 2013	
Yvonne Rippon	Rachel Shelley	14 January 2012	19 January 2013	
Norman Bunton	Adrian Harris	22 September 2012	30 November 2013	
Ella Ashford	Tahirah Sharif	4 May 2013	17 May 2014	
Tamzin Bayle	Gemma Atkinson	13 August 2011	11 October 2014	
Audrey Strachan	Frances Tomelty	6 December 2014	24 January 2015	
Greta Miller	Kazia Pelka	25 July 2015	23 August 2015	
Louis Fairhead	Callum Ray	14 September 1996	30 August 2015	
Louis Fairhead	Liam Hess	14 September 1996	30 August 2015	
Louis Fairhead	Jack Dedman	14 September 1996	30 August 2015	
Louis Fairhead	Gregory Forsyth-Foreman	14 September 1996	30 August 2015	
Ben Harding	Mark Letheren	20 September 2008	19 September 2015	
Honey Wright	Chelsee Healey	11 October 2014	19 September 2015	
Taylor Ashbie	Sarah Jayne Dunn	6 December 2014	10 October 2015	
Nikki Chisom	Anna Acton	21 November 2015	9 January 2016	
Jess Cranham	Kerry Bennett	3 October 2015	30 January 2016	
Olivia Cranham	Grace Doherty	21 November 2015	30 January 2016	
Jack Diamond	Alistair Brammer	5 December 2015	23 April 2016	
Connor Christie	Toby Murray	20 February 2016	30 April 2016	
Mark Richie	Joel Beckett	9 August 2014	30 April 2016	
Shelle Jones	Kelli Hollis	20 February 2016	7 May 2016	
Vince Callaghan	Andrew Knott	26 March 2016	7 May 2016	
Mercedes Christie	Hannah Spearritt	23 January 2016	7 May 2016	
Hazel Leyton	Vicky Hall	8 August 2015	9 July 2016	
Carmel Sims	Sydney Wade	28 May 2016	30 July 2016	
Guy Self	John Michie	22 April 2014	10 September 2016	
Ryan Johnson	Russell Boulter	28 September 2002	10 December 2016	
Sebastian Grayling	Rik Makarem	29 October 2016	7 January 2017	
Amira Zafar	Poppy Jhakra	27 August 2016	11 February 2017	
Steph Sims	Tonicha Lawrence	28 May 2016	25 February 2017	
Roy Ellisson	John Killoran	26 September 2015	29 April 2017	
Hugo Bonning	Billy Angel	12 November 2016	20 May 2017	
Sam Strachan	Tom Chambers	13 February 2016	22 July 2017	
Denise Ellisson	Lucy Benjamin	26 September 2015	26 August 2017	
Mickey Ellisson	Mitch Hewer	22 April 2017	26 August 2017	
Scott Ellisson	Will Austin	22 April 2017	2 September 2017	
Archie Grayling	James Wilby	5 October 2016	4 November 2017	
Lexy Morrell	Jenny Howe	15 October 2016	18 November 2017	
Marty Williams	Roger Griffiths	30 September 2017	9 December 2017	
Sally Hodge	Pam St. Clement	27 August 2016	23 December 2017	
Glen Thomas	Owain Arthur	4 June 2016	31 March 2018	
Leigh-Anne Carr	Cassie Bradley	7 April 2018	23 June 2018	
Eddie McAllister	Joe Gaminara	17 March 2018	25 August 2018	
Brian Carroll	Matthew Marsh	8 August 2015	13 October 2018	
Ciara Cassidy	Belinda Stewart-Wilson	3 March 2018	24 November 2018	
Joshua Bowers	Gareth David-Lloyd	3 November 2018	19 January 2019	
Alasdair "Base" Newman	Max Parker	11 August 2018	2 February 2019	
DC Kate Wilkinson	Amy Noble	29 August 2015	2 February 2019	
Ric Griffin	Hugh Quarshie	26 December 2004	2 March 2019	
Jac Naylor	Rosie Marcel	13 February 2016	2 March 2019	
Kim Harrison	Siân Reeves	18 February 2017	9 March 2019	
Toby Williams	Harry Gilby	30 March 2019	11 May 2019	
Dani Mallison	Georgia Hughes	9 March 2019	8 June 2019	
Omo Masters	Ellen Thomas	22 September 2018	29 June 2019	
Henrik Hanssen	Guy Henry	12 February 2011	11 August 2019	
Theo Laurence	Jim Sturgeon	24 August 2019	2 November 2019	
Effie Laurence	Abigail Hardingham	24 August 2019	16 November 2019	
Bill Crowthers	Clive Wood	25 August 2018	1 February 2020	
Violette Spark	Kelly Gough	21 December 2019	22 February 2020	
Zsa Zsa Harper-Jenkinson	Sharon Gless	18 November 2017	29 February 2020	
Grace Beauchamp	Emily Carey	29 November 2014	3 April 2021	
Graham Kirkby	Philip Wright	13 July 2019	17 April 2021	
Ross West	Chris Gordon	15 September 2018	1 May 2021	
Ciaran Coulson	Rick Warden	1 June 2019	29 May 2021	
Bibi Kirkby	Badria Timimi	3 August 2019	29 May 2021	
Bibi Kirkby	Fisun Burgess	3 August 2019	29 May 2021	
Chrissie Danes	Lauren Crace	4 December 2021	2 April 2022	
Paula Kettering	Rosie Jones	27 February 2021	9 April 2022	
Oliver Hide	Harry Collett	24 September 2016	18 June 2022	
Rosalene Hide	Lorraine Pilkington	24 September 2016	27 August 2022	
Rosalene Hide	Jackie Knowles	24 September 2016	27 August 2022	
Adi Kapadia	Rajendra Bajaj	27 November 2021	8 October 2022	
Jonty Buchanan	Richard Harrington	25 June 2022	14 January 2023	
Paul Pegg	Paul Popplewell	5 June 2021	18 March 2023	
Charlotte Miller	Aurora Jones	18 March 2017	18 March 2023	
Ffion Morgan	Stirling Gallacher	18 July 2020	19 August 2023	
Gethin West	Robert Pugh	15 April 2023	16 September 2023	
Stella Lawson	Kate Williams	2 September 2023	13 January 2024	
Ashok Masum	Kriss Dosanjh	17 August 2019	17 February 2024	
Harry Sinclair	Rod Hallett	13 January 2024	9 March 2024	
Jamie Cleveland	Ryan Hawley	15 June 2024	24 August 2024	
Rich Walker	Michael Keogh	15 June 2024	22 February 2025	
Kareem Hussein	Ravin J Ganatra	4 January 2025	22 February 2025	
Russell Whitelaw	Robert Bathurst	1 March 2025	7 June 2025	
Sean Redmond	Seth Somers	4 January 2025	7 June 2025	
Sunny Callahan	Jamie Marie Leary	14 June 2025	13 September 2025	
Ashley Sullivan	Hannah Traylen	17 January 2026	14 March 2026	
Colonel Jack Bard	Mark Womack	25 April 2026	25 July 2026	

== Bibliography ==
- Donnell, Alison (2002). Companion to contemporary Black British culture. London: Routledge. p. 170. ISBN 978-0415169899.
- Kingsley, Hilary (1995). Casualty: The Inside Story (2nd ed.). Penguin Books. ISBN 0-14-024902-8.
- Newcomb, Horace (3 February 2014). Encyclopedia of Television (2nd ed.). London: Routledge. pp. 478–479. ISBN 9781135194796.
- Perry, Chris (3 February 2016). The Kaleidoscope British Christmas Television Guide 1937-2013 (Illustrated ed.). Lulu.com. p. 108. ISBN 9781900203609.
