= Anttix =

English recording artist and songwriter

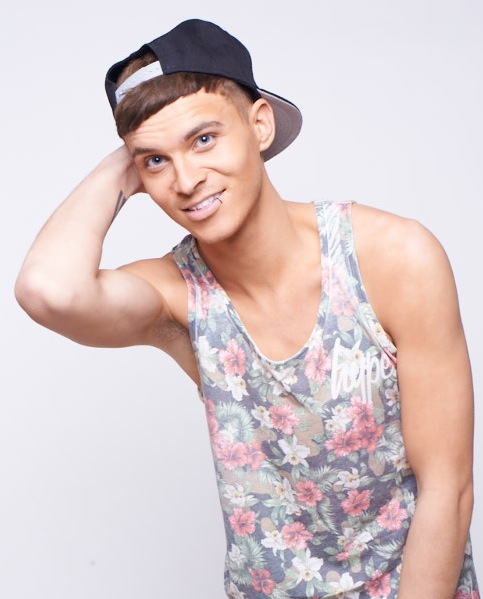
- Anttix

Background information
- Born: Antony James Llewellyn; 14 August 1989 (age 37); Bristol, England
- Genres: Pop
- Occupation: Singer-songwriter
- Instrument: Vocals
- Website: www.anttix.tv

Antony James Llewellyn (born 14 August 1989), known by his stage name Anttix, is an English recording artist and songwriter.

== Career ==
In January 2013, released his first mainstream promotional single, "Fame and TV", featuring Gemz with the associated music video released on Vevo. In March 2013, Anttix performed at his first international headline gig in Portugal followed up with a showing at In the Park 2013. He went on to share the stage with British artists The Saturdays, Ed Sheeran, McFly, Rita Ora and Conor Maynard.

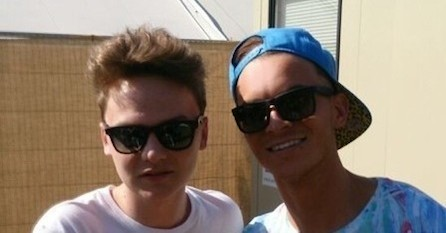
Anttix backstage with Conor Maynard at "One in the Park" 2013

The official single, "Tornado", was released on 28 July 2013. The 'Cutmore Remix' of "Tornado" peaked at number 6 of the official UK Club Chart. He also went on a UK school tour to promote "Tornado", also putting an anti-bullying message during his tour in support of the national British charity The Cybersmile Foundation.

On 28 November 2013, he released "Be Alright", an official Anti-Bullying Week single.

He is now part of Creator Universe, who manage influencers such as The Nursery Nurse.

== Early life ==
Anttix was born and raised in Kingswood, Bristol, the son of Rita and James Llewellyn. He attended Courtney Primary School Kingsfield School, Prior to signing his first music contract, Anttix performed as part of a European youth performing arts group, Kingswood Ten Sing, during his time performing to audiences across Europe.

== Discography ==
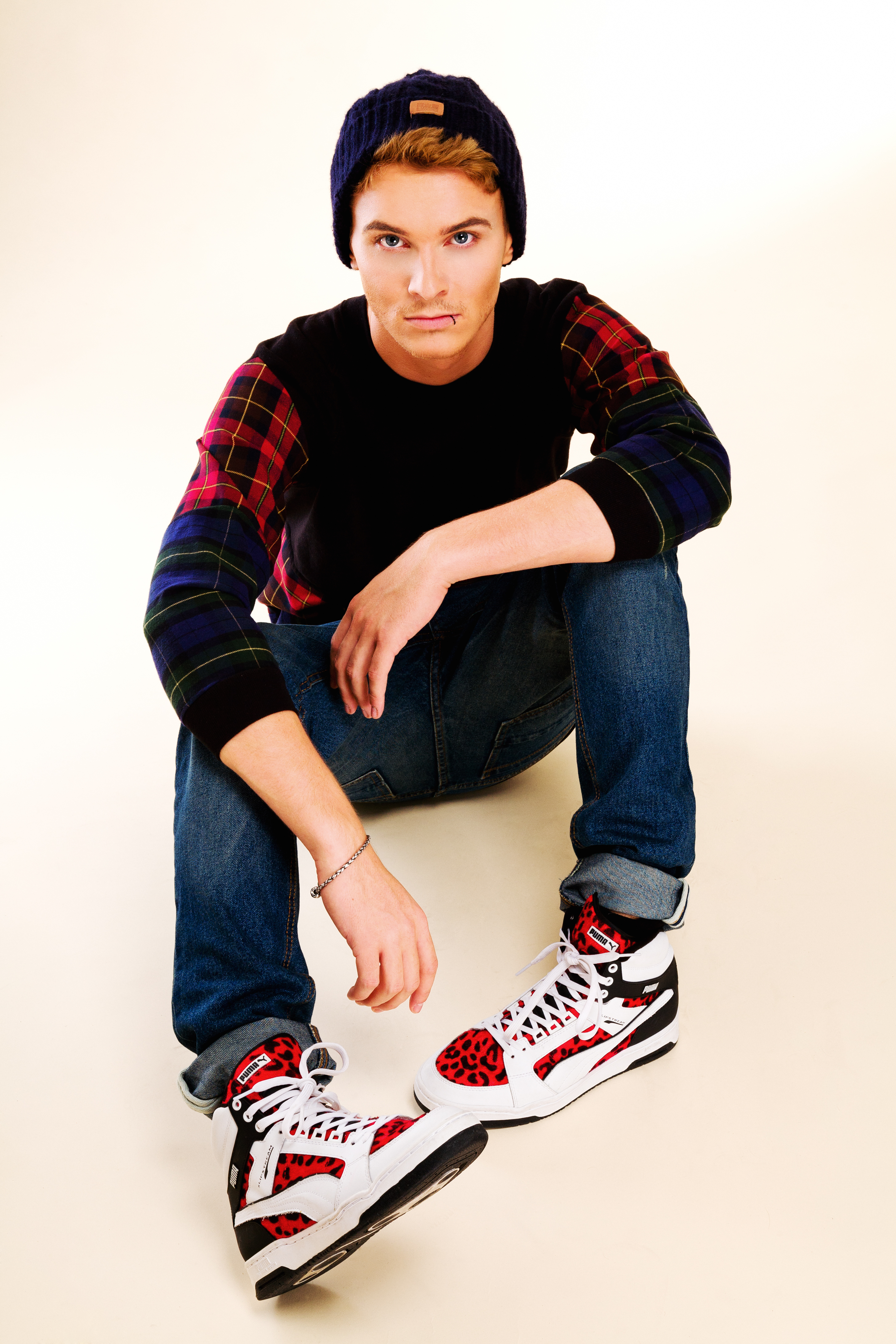
Anttix (2012)

=== Singles ===
- 2012: "Fame and TV" (feat. Gemz)
- 2013: "Tornado"
- 2013: "Be Alright"
