= List of Casualty episodes (series 35–present) =

The following is a list of the episodes of the British television series Casualty that have aired since the thirty-fifth series. Casualty premiered on 6 September 1986 and was originally commissioned for fifteen episodes. The first series concluded on 27 December 1986, and following its success, a second series was commissioned. Casualty has continued running since, and the fortieth series concluded airing in September 2026.

== Series overview ==
Series	Episodes	Originally released	
Series	Episodes	First released	Last released
1	15	6 September 1986	27 December 1986
2	15	12 September 1987	19 December 1987
3	10	9 September 1988	11 November 1988
4	12	8 September 1989	1 December 1989
5	13	7 September 1990	7 December 1990
6	15	6 September 1991	27 February 1992
7	24	12 September 1992	27 February 1993
8	24	18 September 1993	26 February 1994
9	24	17 September 1994	25 March 1995
10	24	16 September 1995	24 February 1996
11	24	14 September 1996	22 February 1997
12	26	11 September 1997 (Note: The opening episode was originally billed for 6 September 1997, but was deferred due to the funeral of Diana, Princess of Wales. BBC1 showed the film Free Willy in its place.)	28 February 1998
13	28	5 September 1998	13 March 1999
14	30	18 September 1999	25 March 2000
15	36	16 September 2000	28 April 2001
16	40	15 September 2001	29 June 2002
17	40	14 September 2002	21 June 2003
18	46	13 September 2003	28 August 2004
19	48	11 September 2004	20 August 2005
20	48	10 September 2005	26 August 2006
21	48	23 September 2006	4 August 2007
22	48	8 September 2007	9 August 2008
23	48	13 September 2008	1 August 2009
24	48	12 September 2009	21 August 2010
25	47	4 September 2010	6 August 2011
26	42	13 August 2011	22 July 2012
27	44	18 August 2012	26 July 2013
28	48	3 August 2013	23 August 2014
29	46	30 August 2014	23 August 2015
30	43	29 August 2015	30 July 2016
31	45	27 August 2016	29 July 2017
32	44	19 August 2017	4 August 2018
33	46	11 August 2018	10 August 2019
34	43	17 August 2019	26 September 2020
35	30	2 January 2021	7 August 2021
36	44	14 August 2021	13 August 2022
37	43	20 August 2022	19 August 2023
38	36	26 August 2023	3 August 2024
39	34	10 August 2024	12 July 2025
40	34	2 August 2025	5 September 2026
41	TBA	TBA	TBA

== Episodes ==
=== Series 35 (2021) ===
No. overall	No. in series	Episode	Directed by	Written by	Original release date	UK viewers (millions)
1183	1	Episode 1	Steve Hughes	Kevin Rundle	2 January 2021	N/A (<5.19) (Note: Not reported in the weekly top 15 programmes for four-screen viewer ratings.)
1184	2	Episode 2	Ruth Carney	Oliver Frampton	9 January 2021	N/A (<5.28)
1185	3	Episode 3	Andy Newbery	Colin Bytheway	16 January 2021	N/A (<4.65)
1186	4	Episode 4	Andy Newbery	Hilary Frankland	23 January 2021	N/A (<4.87)
1187	5	Episode 5	Steve M Kelly	Simon Norman	30 January 2021	N/A (<4.60)
1188	6	Episode 6	Steve M Kelly	Dana Fainaru	6 February 2021	N/A (<4.81)
1189	7	Episode 7	John Maidens	Katerina Watson and Hilary Frankland	13 February 2021	4.38
1190	8	Episode 8	John Maidens	Stephen McAteer	20 February 2021	N/A (<4.54)
1191	9	Episode 9	Julie Edwards	Dana Fainaru	27 February 2021	N/A (<4.68)
1192	10	Episode 10	Julie Edwards	Philip Lawrence	6 March 2021	N/A (<4.80)
1193	11	Episode 11	Miranda Howard-Williams	Colin Bytheway	13 March 2021	N/A (<4.60)
1194	12	Episode 12	Miranda Howard-Williams	Emma Dennis-Edwards and Stephen McAteer	27 March 2021	N/A (<4.56)
1195	13	Episode 13	Andy Newbery	Adam Hughes and Kevin Rundle	3 April 2021	4.13
1196	14	Episode 14	Andy Newbery	Ed Sellek	10 April 2021	N/A (<4.64)
1197	15	Episode 15	Nimer Rashed	Sam Holdsworth	17 April 2021	N/A (<4.64)
1198	16	Episode 16	Paul Riordan	Debbie Owen	24 April 2021	N/A (<4.13)
1199	17	Episode 17	Paul Riordan	Kit Lambert	1 May 2021	N/A (<4.23)
1200	18	Episode 18	Katherine Churcher	Rebecca Wojciechowski	8 May 2021	N/A (<4.08)
1201	19	Episode 19	Katherine Churcher	Kellie Smith	8 May 2021	N/A (<4.08)
1202	20	Episode 20	Akaash Meeda	Charlie Swinbourne and Dana Fainaru	15 May 2021	N/A (<4.40)
1203	21	Episode 21	John Howlett	Jayshree Patel and Kellie Smith	29 May 2021	N/A (<4.00)
1204	22	Episode 22	Jennie Paddon	Toby Walton	29 May 2021	N/A (<4.00)
1205	23	Episode 23	Jennie Paddon	Katie Douglas	5 June 2021	N/A (<3.58)
1206	24	Episode 24	Piotr Szkopiak	Joanna Quesnel	5 June 2021	N/A (<3.58)
1207	25	Episode 25	Piotr Szkopiak	Jess Green and Kit Lambert	12 June 2021	N/A (<3.75)
1208	26	Episode 26	John Maidens	Stephen McAteer	10 July 2021	3.46
1209	27	Episode 27	Michael Lacey	Hilary Frankland	17 July 2021	3.42
1210	28	Episode 28	Michael Lacey	Dana Fainaru	24 July 2021	3.82
1211	29	Episode 29	Matt Hilton	Kevin Rundle	31 July 2021	3.96
1212	30	Episode 30	Matt Hilton	Ed Sellek	7 August 2021	4.31

=== Series 36 (2021–2022) ===
No. overall	No. in series	Title	Directed by	Written by	Original release date	UK viewers (millions)
1213	1	"Begin Again"	Piotr Szkopiak	Hilary Frankland and Ed Sellek	14 August 2021	3.98
1214	2	"Same Old, Same Old"	Judith Dine	Toby Walton	21 August 2021	3.83
1215	3	"Short Fuses"	Judith Dine	Rachel Harper	28 August 2021	3.19
1216	4	"No Harm Done"	George C Siougas	Hilary Frankland	4 September 2021	3.29
1217	5	"The Road Less Travelled"	George C Siougas	Katie Douglas	18 September 2021	3.95
1218	6	"Warning Signs"	Michael Lacey	David Bowker	2 October 2021	3.47
1219	7	"Broken"	Michael Lacey	Joanna Quesnel	9 October 2021	3.93
1220	8	"Is the Patient Breathing?"	John Howlett	Simon Norman and Hilary Frankland	23 October 2021	4.02
1221	9 (Note: "Two Tribes" was set to air on 16 October 2021 as episode 8 but was pulled from the schedule due to the death of David Amess. It was later aired as episode 9 on 30 October 2021.)	"Two Tribes"	John Howlett	Stephen McAteer	30 October 2021	3.77
1222	10	"Blinded"	Conor Morrissey	Jenny Davis	6 November 2021	3.52
1223	11	"Two Minutes"	George C Siougas	Dan Berlinka	6 November 2021	3.48
1224	12	"Gasping for Air"	Piotr Szkopiak	Stephen McAteer	20 November 2021	3.45
1225	13	"Retribution"	Piotr Szkopiak	Dana Fainaru	27 November 2021	N/A (<4.44)
1226	14	"Remember Me, Part One"	Matt Hilton	Barbara Machin	4 December 2021	N/A (<4.34)
1227	15	"Remember Me, Part Two"	Matt Hilton	Barbara Machin	11 December 2021	3.40
1228	16	"Handcuffs"	Eric Styles	Katie Douglas	8 January 2022	N/A (<4.72)
1229	17	"She's My Baby"	Eric Styles	Lydia Marchant	15 January 2022	N/A (<4.35)
1230	18	"Close Encounters"	Thomas Hescott	Hamish Wright	22 January 2022	N/A (<4.02)
1231	19	"Delayed Reaction"	Thomas Hescott	Ed Sellek and Jason Sutton	29 January 2022	N/A (<4.30)
1232	20	"Ena"	Roberto Bangura	Lindsey Alford	5 February 2022	N/A (<4.17)
1233	21	"The Choice"	Roberto Bangura	Barbara Machin	12 February 2022	N/A
1234	22	"On the Edge"	Paul Riordan	Naylah Ahmed and Stephen McAteer	19 February 2022	N/A
1235	23	"Balancing the Books"	Paul Riordan	Hilary Frankland	26 February 2022	N/A
1236	24	"Apron Strings"	Matt Hilton	Rachel Harper	26 February 2022	N/A
1237	25	"Balancing the Scales"	Matt Hilton	Simon Norman	5 March 2022	3.30
1238	26	"Now, I Can Breathe"	Judith Dine	Sean Robert Daniels and Stephen McAteer	12 March 2022	3.10
1239	27	"Break Your Heart"	Judith Dine	Lisa McMullin	19 March 2022	3.26
1240	28	"Trigger"	Dan Berlinka	Dan Berlinka	26 March 2022	2.88
1241	29	"Judgement Call"	Merlyn Rice	Philip Ralph	2 April 2022	3.10
1242	30	"I Will Trust in You"	Merlyn Rice	Sam Holdsworth and Dana Fainaru	9 April 2022	N/A
1243	31	"Friends Like These"	Alex Jacob	Da Nixon	16 April 2022	N/A
1244	32	"Burning Love"	Alex Jacob	David Bowker	23 April 2022	N/A
1245	33	"Road to Nowhere"	Hildegard Ryan	Naomi Soneye-Thomas	30 April 2022	2.60
1246	34	"First Date"	Hildegard Ryan	Kevin Rundle	30 April 2022	N/A
1247	35	"Dark Room"	Carys Lewis	Ed Sellek	7 May 2022	2.64
1248	36	"Found You"	Amanda Mealing	Toby Walton	21 May 2022	2.47
1249	37	"Never Alone"	Justin Edgar	Berri George and Colin Bytheway	28 May 2022	N/A
1250	38	"By Any Means"	David Innes Edwards	Rebekah Harrison	11 June 2022	N/A
1251 (Note: "Wednesday's Child" is a feature length episode with a runtime of 75 minutes.)	39 (Note: "Wednesday's Child" was set to air on 11 June 2022 as episode 38 but was pulled from the schedule due to the Robb Elementary School shooting. It was instead broadcast as episode 39 on 18 June 2022.)	"Wednesday's Child"	Judith Dine	Hilary Frankland and Stephen McAteer	18 June 2022	2.47
1252	40	"Blame Game"	David Innes Edwards	Michelle Lipton	25 June 2022	2.61
1253	41	"One In, One Out"	Duncan Foster	Toby Walton	25 June 2022	2.63
1254	42	"Parental Guidance"	Piotr Szkopiak	Rachel Harper	2 July 2022	2.87
1255 (Note: "No Good Deed" is a feature length episode with a runtime of 75 minutes.)	43	"No Good Deed"	Michael Lacey	Michelle Lipton	16 July 2022	2.76
1256	44	"Survivor"	Piotr Szkopiak	Lydia Marchant	13 August 2022	2.58

=== Series 37 (2022–2023) ===
No. overall	No. in series	Title	Directed by	Written by	Original release date	UK viewers (millions)
1257	1	"All Time High"	Rick Platt	Colin Bytheway	20 August 2022	2.38
1258	2	"We Need to Talk About Ollie"	Rick Platt	Lindsey Alford	27 August 2022	2.39
1259	3	"Falling"	Eric Styles	Ed Sellek	3 September 2022	2.35
1260	4	"Skin Deep"	Eric Styles	Jenny Davis and Rachel Harper	3 September 2022	N/A (<2.32) (Note: Not reported in the weekly top 50 programmes.)
1261	5	"Derby Day"	George C Siougas	Toby Walton	10 September 2022	N/A (<2.64)
1262	6	"Enough"	George C Siougas	Ciara Conway	17 September 2022	N/A (<2.97)
1263	7	"Coming Clean"	Carys Lewis	Colin Bytheway	1 October 2022	3.01
1264	8	"Just Between Us"	Carys Lewis	Charlotte Cromie	8 October 2022	N/A (<2.87)
1265	9	"People Skills"	Candida Scott Knight	Michelle Lipton	19 November 2022	N/A (<2.90)
1266	10	"Confidence and Paranoia"	Candida Scott Knight	Jodie Ashdown	26 November 2022	N/A (<2.53)
1267	11	"Leap of Faith"	Steve Hughes	Lisa McMullin	4 December 2022	N/A (<3.01)
1268	12	"Thin Green Line"	Steve Hughes	Stephen McAteer	10 December 2022	N/A (<3.20)
In Plain Sight
1269	13	"Start the Fire"	Thomas Hescott	Ed Sellek	7 January 2023	N/A (<3.33)
1270	14	"Fear Not"	Thomas Hescott	Rebekah Harrison	14 January 2023	N/A (<2.95)
1271	15	"Lost in Translation"	David Innes Edwards	Kevin Erlis and Hilary Frankland	21 January 2023	N/A (<2.96)
1272	16	"Fight or Flight"	David Innes Edwards	Rachel Harper	4 February 2023	N/A (<2.89)
1273	17	"IOU"	Enda Hughes	Becky Prestwich	11 February 2023	N/A (<2.94)
1274	18	"Running on Empty"	Enda Hughes	Claire Miller	11 February 2023	N/A (<2.94)
1275	19	"Crash Landing"	Lance Kneeshaw	Rebekah Harrison	18 February 2023	N/A (<2.73)
1276	20	"Not Important"	Lance Kneeshaw	Hilary Frankland	25 February 2023	2.84
1277	21	"Pushover"	Matt Hilton	Hilary Frankland	4 March 2023	2.85
1278	22	"Falling Down"	Paul Riordan	Gem Copping	11 March 2023	N/A
1279	23	"The Straw"	Paul Riordan	Michelle Lipton	18 March 2023	3.05
1280	24	"No Regrets"	Cóilín Ó Scolaí	Hilary Frankland	25 March 2023	3.15
1281	25	"Baby, I Don't Care"	Cóilín Ó Scolaí	Ed Sellek	1 April 2023	2.91
Welcome to the Warzone
1282	26	"Welcome to the Warzone"	Jamie Annett	Rachel Harper	8 April 2023	2.84
1283	27	"Pride and Prejudice"	Jamie Annett	Michelle Lipton	15 April 2023	2.59
1284	28	"With a Bullet"	Thomas Hescott	Rebekah Harrison	22 April 2023	2.72
1285	29	"Screwdriver"	Thomas Hescott	Ed Sellek	29 April 2023	2.70
1286	30	"Keep Breathing"	Sean Healy	Toby Walton	6 May 2023	2.07
1287	31	"Believe Me"	Sean Healy	Rebekah Harrison	20 May 2023	2.59
1288	32	"Once Bitten"	Duncan Foster	Rachel Harper	27 May 2023	2.56
1289	33	"Armour-Plated"	Duncan Foster	Becky Prestwich	3 June 2023	2.76
1290	34	"Separation"	Enda Hughes	Jamie Davis	10 June 2023	2.59
1291	35	"Deliverance"	Enda Hughes	Erin Kubicki	17 June 2023	2.72
1292	36	"Lose Yourself"	Conor Morrissey	Ciara Conway	24 June 2023	2.46
1293	37	"Burning Bridges"	Conor Morrissey	Hilary Frankland	1 July 2023	2.62
1294	38	"How to Save a Life"	Steve Hughes	Jay Kumar	15 July 2023	2.60
Driving Force
1295	39	"Hooke's Law"	Christopher McGill	Al Smith	22 July 2023	2.76
1296	40	"Little White Lies"	Christopher McGill	Michelle Lipton	29 July 2023	2.83
1297	41	"Dog Days"	Ian Barnes	Ed Sellek	5 August 2023	2.60
1298	42	"Pull Together, Push Apart"	Ian Barnes	Poz Watson	12 August 2023	2.56
1299	43	"Too Young, Too Soon"	Michael Lacey	Kevin Rundle	19 August 2023	2.46

=== Series 38 (2023–2024) ===
No. overall	No. in series	Title	Directed by	Written by	Original release date	UK viewers (millions)
Driving Force
1300	1	"Aftermath"	Vicki Kisner	Rebekah Harrison	26 August 2023	2.60
1301	2	"The Ostrich Effect"	Vicki Kisner	Claire Miller	2 September 2023	2.79
1302	3	"One Hundred Years"	Miguel Guerreiro	Toby Walton	2 September 2023	2.93
1303	4	"Hard Pill"	Miguel Guerreiro	Rachel Harper	9 September 2023	2.53
1304	5	"Too Much, Too Young"	Cóilín Ó Scolaí	Hilary Frankland	16 September 2023	3.14
1305	6	"Switzerland"	Cóilín Ó Scolaí	Michelle Lipton	16 September 2023	2.89
A History of Violence
1306	7	"Tinderbox"	Suri Krishnamma	Isla Gray	30 December 2023	N/A (<3.17)
1307	8	"Aftershock"	Suri Krishnamma	Becky Prestwich	6 January 2024	N/A (<3.15)
1308	9	"Barriers"	Lance Kneeshaw	Rebekah Harrison	13 January 2024	3.09
1309	10	"Red Flags"	Lance Kneeshaw	Ciara Conway	20 January 2024	3.11
1310	11	"Liability"	Jamie Annett	Claire Miller	27 January 2024	2.89
1311	12	"Take the Strain"	Jamie Annett	Toby Walton	3 February 2024	3.08
1312	13	"Willing and Able"	Paul Riordan	Toby Walton	10 February 2024	2.93
1313	14	"Last Words"	Paul Riordan	Poz Watson	17 February 2024	2.98
1314	15	"Haunted"	Paul Murphy	Isla Gray	24 February 2024	2.96
1315	16	"Easy Way Out"	Paul Murphy	Kevin Rundle	2 March 2024	2.96
1316	17	"Trauma"	Michael Lacey	Michelle Lipton	9 March 2024	3.13
1317	18	"Charlie"	Michael Lacey	Michelle Lipton	16 March 2024	3.47
Breaking Point
1318	19	"System Failure"	Judith Dine	Rebekah Harrison	23 March 2024	N/A
1319	20	"Core Wounds"	Judith Dine	Rachel Harper	23 March 2024	2.63
1320	21	"Earn Your Stripes"	Conor Morrissey	Claire Miller	30 March 2024	2.84
1321	22	"Childhood's End"	Conor Morrissey	Ed Sellek	6 April 2024	2.87
1322	23	"Breathe with Me"	Matthew Evans	Poz Watson	13 April 2024	2.77
1323	24	"Into the Fire"	Matthew Evans	Al Smith	20 April 2024	2.67
1324	25	"The Whistleblower"	Christopher McGill	Isla Gray	27 April 2024	2.66
1325	26	"The Longest Shift"	Christopher McGill	Poz Watson	4 May 2024	2.65
1326	27	"Shame the Devil"	David Kester	Lindsey Alford	18 May 2024	2.71
1327	28	"Siege Mentality"	David Kester	Hilary Frankland	25 May 2024	3.06
1328	29	"Red-Handed"	Matt Hilton	Rachel Harper	1 June 2024	2.92
1329	30	"The Last Post"	Matt Hilton	Hilary Frankland	8 June 2024	3.01
Storm Damage
1330	31	"Sinking Ships – Day 1"	George C Siougas	Toby Walton	15 June 2024	N/A
1331	32	"Sinking Ships – Day 2"	George C Siougas	Toby Walton	22 June 2024	2.52
1332	33	"After the Flood"	Duncan Foster	Poz Watson	13 July 2024	2.47
1333	34	"Ghosts"	Duncan Foster	Erin Kubicki	20 July 2024	2.76
1334	35	"Duped"	Sean Healy	Hilary Frankland	27 July 2024	N/A
1335	36	"Man's Best Friend"	Sean Healy	Isla Gray	3 August 2024	N/A

=== Series 39 (2024–2025) ===
No. overall	No. in series	Title	Directed by	Written by	Original release date	UK viewers (millions)
Storm Damage
1336	1	"All for Love"	Conor Morrissey	Rebekah Harrison and Claire Miller	10 August 2024	2.41
1337	2	"Downfall"	Conor Morrissey	Claire Miller	17 August 2024	2.68
1338	3	"Absolution"	Steve Hughes	Toby Walton	24 August 2024	2.75
1339	4	"The Right Amount"	Steve Hughes	Ed Sellek and Poz Watson	31 August 2024	2.59
1340	5	"The Truth Will Set You Free"	Cóilín Ó Scolaí	Isla Gray	7 September 2024	2.35
1341	6	"Freedom"	Cóilín Ó Scolaí	Poz Watson	7 September 2024	2.36
Special
1342	–	"All I Want for Christmas"	Steve Hughes	Erin Kubicki	21 December 2024	3.14
Public Property
1343	7	"Off Duty"	Suri Krishnamma	Lindsey Alford and Hilary Frankland	28 December 2024	3.12
1344	8	"On Trial"	Suri Krishnamma	Lindsey Alford and Hilary Frankland	4 January 2025	<3.10
1345	9	"Bite the Bullet"	Paul Murphy	Rachel Harper	11 January 2025	2.99
1346	10	"Defamation"	Paul Murphy	Erin Kubicki	18 January 2025	<2.77
1347	11	"Precipice"	Jamie Annett	Mark Catley	25 January 2025	2.98
1348	12	"Freefall"	Jamie Annett	Isla Gray	1 February 2025	3.07
1349	13	"Out of Time"	Jordan Hogg	Erin Kubicki	8 February 2025	2.90
1350	14	"Jodie"	Jordan Hogg	Claire Miller	15 February 2025	2.99
1351	15	"Brace, Brace, Brace"	Matthew Evans	Simon Norman	22 February 2025	3.01
1352	16	"Unearthed"	Matthew Evans	Matthew McDevitt	1 March 2025	2.84
1353	17	"Just Like You"	George Siougas	Toby Walton	8 March 2025	2.85
Internal Affairs
1354	18	"Everything Changes"	George Siougas	Poz Watson	15 March 2025	2.68
1355	19	"Civil War"	Judith Dine	Michelle Lipton	22 March 2025	2.72
1356	20	"Stalemate"	Judith Dine	Isla Gray	29 March 2025	2.96
1357	21	"Enemy Lines"	Karl Neilson	Michelle Lipton	5 April 2025	2.75
1358	22	"Collateral Damage"	Karl Neilson	Michelle Lipton	12 April 2025	2.88
1359	23	"Fight Bite"	Paul Murphy	Poz Watson	19 April 2025	2.89
1360	24	"Plan B"	Cóilín Ó Scolaí	Claire Miller	26 April 2025	2.80
1361	25	"Paper Planes"	Cóilín Ó Scolaí	Al Smith	3 May 2025	2.53
1362	26	"Save Yourself"	Sean Healy	Poz Watson	10 May 2025	2.65
1363	27	"For the Record"	Sean Healy	Rachel Harper	24 May 2025	2.45
1364	28	"Dutch Courage"	David Kester	Mark Catley	31 May 2025	2.48
1365	29	"Non-Disclosure"	David Kester	Simon Norman	7 June 2025	2.60
Supply and Demand
1366	30	"Episode 1"	Duncan Foster	Toby Walton	14 June 2025	2.59
1367	31	"Episode 2"	Duncan Foster	Erin Kubicki	21 June 2025	2.44
1368	32	"Episode 3"	Paul Riordan	Michelle Lipton	28 June 2025	2.37
1369	33	"Episode 4"	Paul Riordan	Claire Miller	12 July 2025	2.30

=== Series 40 (2025–2026) ===
No. overall	No. in series	Title	Directed by	Written by	Original release date	UK viewers (millions)
Supply and Demand
1370	1	"Episode 5"	Conor Morrissey	Rachel Harper	2 August 2025	2.98
1371	2	"Episode 6"	Conor Morrissey	Isla Gray	9 August 2025	2.98
1372	3	"Episode 7"	Matthew Evans	Simon Norman	16 August 2025	2.82
1373	4	"Episode 8"	Phoebe Barran	Poz Watson	23 August 2025	2.83
1374	5	"Episode 9"	Judith Dine	Mark Catley	30 August 2025	2.89
1375	6	"Episode 10"	Judith Dine	Michelle Lipton	6 September 2025	2.77
1376	7	"Episode 11"	Paul Murphy	Claire Miller	13 September 2025	2.82
1377	8	"Episode 12"	Paul Murphy	Erin Kubicki	20 September 2025	3.03
Learning Curve
1378	9	"Episode 1"	Seán Healy	Toby Walton	10 January 2026	<2.87
1379	10	"Episode 2"	Seán Healy	Poz Watson	17 January 2026	<2.71
1380	11	"Episode 3"	Jamie Annett	Michelle Lipton	24 January 2026	2.96
1381	12	"Episode 4"	Jamie Annett	Claire Miller	31 January 2026	3.10
1382	13	"Episode 5"	Cóilín Ó Scolaí	Isla Gray	7 February 2026	2.93
1383	14	"Episode 6"	Mingyu Lin	Amy Guyler	14 February 2026	2.80
1384	15	"Episode 7"	Conor Morrissey	Poz Watson	28 February 2026	<2.62
1385	16	"Episode 8"	Conor Morrissey	Erin Kubicki	7 March 2026	3.01
1386	17	"Episode 9"	Sarah Esdaile	Patrick Homes	14 March 2026	2.67
1387	18	"Episode 10"	Sarah Esdaile	Toby Walton	21 March 2026	2.68
1388	19	"Episode 11"	Karl Neilson	Claire Miller	11 April 2026	2.49
1389	20	"Episode 12"	Karl Neilson	Michelle Lipton	18 April 2026	2.46
Lethal Legacy
1390	21	"Episode 1"	Judith Dine	Erin Kubicki	25 April 2026	2.57
1391	22	"Episode 2"	Judith Dine	Poz Watson	2 May 2026	2.51
1392	23	"Episode 3"	George Siougas	Patrick Homes	9 May 2026	2.35
1393	24	"Episode 4"	George Siougas	Erin Kubicki	23 May 2026	2.29
1394	25	"Episode 5"	Paul Riordan	Toby Walton	30 May 2026	2.34
1395	26	"Episode 6"	Paul Riordan	Erin Kubicki	6 June 2026	2.41
1396	27	"Episode 7"	Rhys Carter	Patrick Homes	13 June 2026	2.33
1397	28	"Episode 8"	Gareth Edward Evans	Michelle Lipton	20 June 2026	2.48
1398	29	"Episode 9"	Jenny Thompson	Alex Mathias	27 June 2026	2.20
1399	30	"Episode 10"	Jenny Thompson	Poz Watson	11 July 2026	2.14
1400	31	"Episode 11"	Karl Neilson	Erin Kubicki	18 July 2026	2.50
1401	32	"Episode 12"	Karl Neilson	Claire Miller	25 July 2026	2.42
40th Anniversary Special
1402	33	"40th Anniversary Part 1"	Steve Hughes	Toby Walton	5 September 2026	2.54
1403	34	"40th Anniversary Part 2"	Steve Hughes	Michelle Lipton	5 September 2026	2.48

=== Series 41 (2027) ===
No. overall	No. in series	Title	Directed by	Written by	Original release date	UK viewers (millions)
1404	1	TBA	TBA	TBA	TBA	TBD

== See also ==
- Lists of Casualty episodes
