= Lists of Casualty episodes =

For the British medical drama television series Casualty, List of Casualty episodes may refer to:

- List of Casualty episodes (series 1–20)
- List of Casualty episodes (series 21–34)
- List of Casualty episodes (series 35–present)

== Series overview ==
Series	Episodes	Originally released	
Series	Episodes	First released	Last released
1	15	6 September 1986	27 December 1986
2	15	12 September 1987	19 December 1987
3	10	9 September 1988	11 November 1988
4	12	8 September 1989	1 December 1989
5	13	7 September 1990	7 December 1990
6	15	6 September 1991	27 February 1992
7	24	12 September 1992	27 February 1993
8	24	18 September 1993	26 February 1994
9	24	17 September 1994	25 March 1995
10	24	16 September 1995	24 February 1996
11	24	14 September 1996	22 February 1997
12	26	11 September 1997 (Note: The opening episode was originally billed for 6 September 1997, but was deferred due to the funeral of Diana, Princess of Wales. BBC1 showed the film Free Willy in its place.)	28 February 1998
13	28	5 September 1998	13 March 1999
14	30	18 September 1999	25 March 2000
15	36	16 September 2000	28 April 2001
16	40	15 September 2001	29 June 2002
17	40	14 September 2002	21 June 2003
18	46	13 September 2003	28 August 2004
19	48	11 September 2004	20 August 2005
20	48	10 September 2005	26 August 2006
21	48	23 September 2006	4 August 2007
22	48	8 September 2007	9 August 2008
23	48	13 September 2008	1 August 2009
24	48	12 September 2009	21 August 2010
25	47	4 September 2010	6 August 2011
26	42	13 August 2011	22 July 2012
27	44	18 August 2012	26 July 2013
28	48	3 August 2013	23 August 2014
29	46	30 August 2014	23 August 2015
30	43	29 August 2015	30 July 2016
31	45	27 August 2016	29 July 2017
32	44	19 August 2017	4 August 2018
33	46	11 August 2018	10 August 2019
34	43	17 August 2019	26 September 2020
35	30	2 January 2021	7 August 2021
36	44	14 August 2021	13 August 2022
37	43	20 August 2022	19 August 2023
38	36	26 August 2023	3 August 2024
39	34	10 August 2024	12 July 2025
40	34	2 August 2025	5 September 2026
41	TBA	TBA	TBA
