= Rachel Harper =

Rachel Harper may refer to:

- Rachel M. Harper, American novelist and academic
- Rachel Harper, writer of several episodes of British TV series Casualty
