= All I Want for Christmas =

All I Want for Christmas may refer to:

== Film ==
- All I Want for Christmas (film), a 1991 film starring Lauren Bacall and Thora Birch
- All I Want for Christmas, a 2007 TV film featuring Robert Pine

== Music ==
- "All I Want (For Christmas)", a 2019 song by Liam Payne
- "All I Want for Christmas", a song by Shonen Knife
- "All I Want for Christmas", a song by Joss Stone, written and produced by Dan Mackenzie
- "All I Want for Christmas Is a Dukla Prague Away Kit", a song by Half Man Half Biscuit on The Trumpton Riots EP (1986)

== Television episodes ==
- "All I Want for Christmas" (8 Simple Rules)
- "All I Want for Christmas" (Casualty)
- "All I Want for Christmas" (Doctors)
- "All I Want for Christmas" (EastEnders)
- "All I Want for Christmas" (Everybody Loves Raymond)
- "All I Want for Christmas" (Fame)
- "All I Want for Christmas" (Happy Days)
- "All I Want for Christmas" (The Jeffersons)
- "All I Want for Christmas" (Newport Harbor: The Real Orange County)
- "All I Want for Christmas" (On Our Own)

== See also ==
- "All I Want for Christmas Is You", a 1994 song by Mariah Carey
- All I Want for Christmas Is You (Vince Vance & the Valiants song), a 1989 song
- All I Want for Christmas Is You (disambiguation)
- "All I Want for Christmas Is My Two Front Teeth", a 1944 song written by Donald Yetter Gardner
- "All I Want for Christmas Is a Beatle", a 1963 novelty song by Dora Bryan
- All I Watch for Christmas, a cable television block
