= All I Want for Christmas Is You (disambiguation) =

"All I Want for Christmas Is You" is a 1994 song by Mariah Carey.

All I Want for Christmas Is You may also refer to:

- "All I Want for Christmas Is You" (Vince Vance & The Valiants song), 1989
- "All I Want for Christmas Is You: A Night of Joy and Festivity," a residency show by Mariah Carey from 2014 to 2019
- All I Want for Christmas Is You (film), a 2017 animated feature based on the Carey song and her 2015 book of the same name
- "All I Want for Christmas Is You", a 1966 song by Carla Thomas
- "All I Want for Christmas Is You", a song by Big Bird from the 1996 Sesame Street television special Elmo Saves Christmas
- "A Christmas Love Song" (music by Johnny Mandel, lyrics by Alan Bergman and Marilyn Bergman), with the first line "All I Want for Christmas Is You" sometimes mistaken for the title

== See also ==
- All I Want for Christmas (disambiguation)
