= Casualty series 39 =

Series 39 of Casualty

Casualty
- Series 39
- Starring: Manpreet Bachu; William Beck; Di Botcher; Anna Chell; Milo Clarke; Sammy T. Dobson; Melanie Hill; Elinor Lawless; Kirsty Mitchell; Neet Mohan; Adesuwa Oni; Sarah Seggari; Kellie Shirley; Michael Stevenson; Charles Venn; Barney Walsh; Naomi Wakszlak; Olly Rix
- No. of episodes: 33 (+1 special)

Release
- Original network: BBC One; BBC One HD
- Original release: 10 August 2024 – 12 July 2025

Series chronology
- ← Previous; Series 38 Next → Series 40

The thirty-ninth series of the British medical drama television series Casualty commenced airing in the United Kingdom on BBC One on 10 August 2024 and concluded on the 12 July 2025. The series focuses on the professional and personal lives of medical and ancillary staff at the emergency department (ED) of the fictional Holby City Hospital. Liza Mellody continued as series producer, with Roxanne Harvey taking over as executive producer following the departure of Jon Sen. Series 39 begins with the second half of the miniseries Storm Damage, continuing from the previous series, and continues with the miniseries Public Property, Internal Affairs and first four episodes of Supply and Demand.

== Production ==
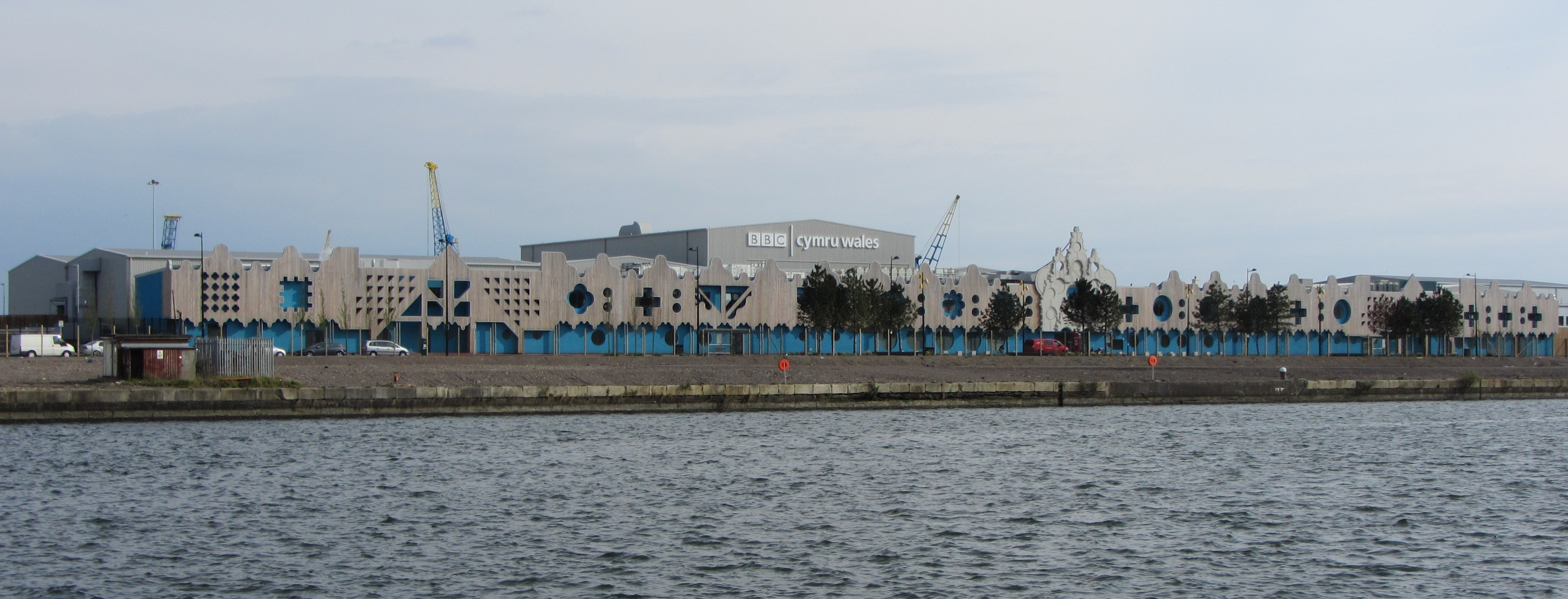
Series 39 is primarily filmed at Roath Lock Studios, located in Cardiff, where the serial has been produced since 2011.

The series began airing in the United Kingdom on 10 August 2024 on BBC One, a week after the conclusion to the previous series. Series 39 is set to continue following a three month break in late 2024. At the end of the Storm Damage miniseries, a trailer for the Christmas special was shown. A subsequent press release stated that "the Christmas special will celebrate the gift of giving and will be told in an innovative, format-breaking way". In November it was confirmed that the episode would revolve around "the miracle of blood" and incorporate real-life testimonies. The subsequent miniseries, entitled Public Property, commenced the week after the Christmas special and consisted of eleven episodes. On 30 January 2025, the following miniseries was announced to be titled Internal Affairs, set to consist of twelve episodes. The most recent miniseries Supply and Demand was announced on 10 June 2025, again consisting of twelve episodes.

Roxanne Harvey was announced as the series' new executive producer in November 2023, taking over from Jon Sen. Harvey looked forward to creating "distinctive, addictive characters alongside ambitious, emotionally epic stories that reflect our modern day NHS". Harvey assumes the role from the Christmas special; no executive producer is credited throughout Storm Damage.

The show introduced an updated version of the title sequence introduced in series 33, starting with the first episode of Internal Affairs. The sequence was truncated to show writer, producer and director credits with the mini-series title below the Casualty logo. The font displaying the cast names in the closing titles were changed to bold. It also marked the show’s return to omitting on-screen episode titles for the first time since series 35. Episodes from Supply and Demand are untitled with episodes 5 to 12 being the first eight episodes of series 40.

== Cast ==
The thirty-ninth series of Casualty features a cast of characters working for the NHS within the emergency department of Holby City Hospital and the Holby Ambulance Service. Sixteen cast members reprised their roles from the previous series, with this series the first not to feature Derek Thompson as Charlie Fairhead.

Manpreet Bachu stars as junior doctor Tariq Hussein, William Beck appears as Dylan Keogh, a consultant in emergency medicine and Di Botcher portrays Jan Jenning, the operational duty manager at Holby Ambulance Service. Anna Chell plays staff nurse and midwife Jodie Whyte and Milo Clarke plays paramedic Theodore "Teddy" Gowan. Sammy T. Dobson continues as junior doctor Nicole Piper with Melanie Hill portraying clinical nurse manager Siobhan McKenzie. Elinor Lawless stars as consultant Stevie Nash with Kirsty Mitchell portraying Faith Cadogan, an advanced clinical practitioner (ACP). Neet Mohan appears as Rash Masum, a clinical fellow whilst Adesuwa Oni continues as staff nurse Ngozi Okoye. Sarah Seggari and Kellie Shirley play staff nurse Rida Amaan and psychiatric liaison nurse Sophia Peters. Michael Stevenson and Charles Venn feature as paramedics Iain Dean and Jacob Masters respectively. Barney Walsh plays staff nurse Cameron Mickelthwaite.

The first episode of Public Property introduces Naomi Wakszlak as trainee paramedic Indie Jankowski. Prior to the third episode of the miniseries it was confirmed that Wakszlak had joined the cast in a regular capacity, with Indie pursuing her third-year placement at Holby. The character is Casualty's first student paramedic. Harvey commented that "Naomi is an emerging talent who brings depth and authenticity to the role, seamlessly capturing Indie’s determination and drive to prove herself in a demanding environment."

From Internal Affairs, Olly Rix joined the cast as Flynn Byron, a former military doctor and clinical lead. Robert Bathurst also appeared as surgeon Russell Whitelaw. Russell is described as "a man who has commanded the operating room for years with his unmatched skill and domineering personality".

Shirley departed in episode 15, the Public Property episode "Brace, Brace, Brace", stating that portraying a storyline involving pregnancy termination was emotionally challenging. Bachu leaves the series in episode 19, the Internal Affairs episode "Civil War."

=== Main characters ===
- Manpreet Bachu as Tariq Hussein (until episode 19)
- William Beck as Dylan Keogh
- Di Botcher as Jan Jenning
- Anna Chell as Jodie Whyte
- Milo Clarke as Teddy Gowan
- Sammy T. Dobson as Nicole Piper
- Melanie Hill as Siobhan McKenzie
- Elinor Lawless as Stevie Nash
- Kirsty Mitchell as Faith Dean
- Neet Mohan as Rash Masum
- Adesuwa Oni as Ngozi Okoye
- Sarah Seggari as Rida Amaan
- Kellie Shirley as Sophia Peters (until episode 15)
- Michael Stevenson as Iain Dean
- Charles Venn as Jacob Masters
- Barney Walsh as Cameron Mickelthwaite
- Naomi Wakszlak as Indie Jankowski (from episode 7)
- Olly Rix as Flynn Byron (from episode 18)

=== Recurring characters ===
- David Ajayi as Blake Gardner
- Michael Keogh as Rich Walker (until episode 15)
- Tom Mulheron as Luka Malinovsky (episodes 4–28)
- Nicola Chegwin as Rosie Cornwall (episodes 6–12)
- Jack Wilkinson as Aaron Bayliss (episodes 7–17)
- Seth Somers as Sean Redmond (episodes 8–29)
- Ravin J Ganatra as Kareem Hussein (episodes 8–15)
- Aryel Tsoto as Obina "Obi" Okoye (episodes 8–32)
- Robert Bathurst as Russell Whitelaw (episodes 16–29)
- Elisabeth Hopper as Claire Byron (episodes 18–29)
- Alicia Charles as Anna Mills (episodes 21–27)
- Jamie Marie Leary as Sunny Callahan (from episode 30)

=== Guest characters ===
- Jeanie Hackman as Yasmin Zandi (episodes 1–3)
- Elin Lloyd Harries as Abigail Donaldson (episode 3)
- Ryan Hawley as Jamie Cleveland (episode 3)
- Ben Walton-Jones as Sonny Davies (episode 4)
- Ryan J Mackay as Bobby Morton (episodes 5 & 6)
- Zoe Brough as Natalia Malinovsky (special and episode 28)
- Lucy-Jo Hudson as Adele Thompson (special and episode 29)
- Isla Merrick-Lawless as Ana Malinovsky (special and episode 28)
- Mia Millichamp-Long as Leah Thompson (special and episode 29)
- Ben Owen-Jones as Ed Lewis (episodes 7 and 8)
- Gina Isaac as Astrid Watson (episodes 9, 12 & 15)
- Philip Hill-Pearson as Detective Simon Bell (episodes 12 and 13)
- Dominic Sharkey as Ben McKenzie (episodes 13 and 22)
- Laurie Brett as Maria Mayhew (episode 14)
- Max Brown as Henry Somerville (episode 14)
- Amy Darton as Vicky Coleman (episode 14)
- Lucy Lowe as Rachel Whyte (episode 14)
- Juliet Garricks as Yvonne Finnery (episodes 15 and 16)
- Elsie Antonia Maurice as Millie Byron (episodes 18 and 30)
- Lola Grace Maurice as Poppie Byron (episodes 18 and 30)
- Helen Crevel as Dr Priya Rowlands (episodes 20 and 25)
- Martin Hancock as Samuel Jankowski (episodes 20, 21, 26 & 28)
- Laura Pitt-Pulford as Cara Harris (episodes 24 and 25)
- Jessica Lawrenson as Olive Harris (episodes 24 and 25)
- Layla Simmons as Libby Evans (episodes 26 and 27)
- Sarah Ridgeway as Lisa Melling (episodes 26 and 27)
- Caroline Sheen as Christine Barker (episodes 28 and 29)
- Ross Waiton as Tim Matthews (episodes 30, 32 & 33)
- Charlie Ann Upton as Cassie Woods (episode 31)
- Israel J. Fredericks as Joel Hannigan (episode 32)
- Lizzie Wilde as Cleo Hainey (episode 32)

== Episodes ==
No. overall	No. in series	Title	Directed by	Written by	Original release date	UK viewers (millions)
Storm Damage
1336	1	"All for Love"	Conor Morrissey	Rebekah Harrison and Claire Miller	10 August 2024	2.41
Jan and Jacob are called out to a crashed prison van, where a prisoner was being transferred. The prisoner attacks Rich with a crowbar and cuts herself, demanding to see her son. Jacob arranges for her son to visit her in hospital but he leaves after a brief meeting, revealing she is in prison for breaking a security guard's ribs after being caught shoplifting and has now lost her chance of parole. Faith finds him upset and he goes back to see his mother, with them parting on better terms and her learning he has an apprenticeship and a place of his own. Sophia sees Blake involved in an altercation at an outreach centre and tells Jacob, who finds Blake sleeping in a derelict building nearby and convinces him to come home with him. Rash talks to Siobhan about resuming training but she wants the all-clear from his therapist. He treats a teenage girl who has been suffering from anxiety since the flood and convinces her father she needs therapy. Rash learns Tariq is still seeing Yasmin. A young woman comes in with a leg injury; she and her boyfriend met at the 2019 market bombing and he thinks she has cancer as stress from the attack. In fact, it is old shrapnel which Siobhan removes and she breaks up with her boyfriend, not wanting to be defined by the incident. Siobhan tells Cam that Jamie is missing. She tries to build bridges between him, Jodie and Rida but they tell him they're moving out. Siobhan invites Cam to have dinner with her family but cancels after Rich tells her he doesn't love her anymore and wants to break up. Guest starring Jessica Johnson, Xavier Russell and Anita Jay
1337	2	"Downfall"	Conor Morrissey	Claire Miller	17 August 2024	2.68
Stevie and Siobhan look after a man who was found wandering around drunk and discover evidence he has been driving. Siobhan tells Stevie about Rich breaking up with her. A teenage boy is brought in after being run over by the man's car; it turns out he is the man's son, who lives with his estranged wife and who he unknowingly hit outside her house. The boy dies in Resus. Jacob brings Blake in to treat an infected wound and admits to Sophia that he thinks Blake might have schizophrenia like his grandmother. Blake gets agitated on seeing Carter and Jan offers to look after the baby while Jacob focuses on Blake. Cam goes to see his father Owen and admits Jamie abused him but didn't rape him like he did Bobby. Owen admits he already knew, having punched Jamie and warned him off. Tariq wants to replace Nicole on the trauma course but Siobhan doesn't think he's been there long enough for them to give a reference. Rash checks out Tariq's last hospital and learns he was fired for a relationship with a patient and suspected of being violent towards her. Tariq goes to break up with Yasmin, who ends up falling from a balcony and cutting herself on a wine bottle. Rash arrives and sends Tariq away on realising he's on drugs, looking after Yasmin until Teddy arrives. However, he tells Tariq he won't lie for him. Guest starring David Nellist and Simon Sherlock
1338	3	"Absolution"	Steve Hughes	Toby Walton	24 August 2024	2.75
Jamie is brought in after being found in his crashed car. He says Bobby forced him off the road and Dylan passes it on to the police. Cam confronts Jamie, who says Cam wanted what he did to him. Jamie later dies of renal failure. Rida is handed a severed finger someone found. The man it belonged to later turns up and tells Dylan, Siobhan and Cam that he lost a finger on the other hand in a work accident and cut it off to be symmetrical. However, he then starts having phantom pains. Stevie tells Nicole she hasn't completed her suturing module. Ngozi helps her practice and they share a kiss. Stevie and Nicole meet a teenage girl who was badly burned when someone set fire to the tent she was sleeping rough in. Her mother visits but quickly leaves, indicating the girl was meant to be looking after her baby brother and he choked to death in his cot when she wasn't there. Jodie worries about Max on hearing his camp has been attacked but learns he had moved. She confesses to Teddy about the dating apps and he breaks up with her. Stevie admits to Rich that things might have worked between them in different circumstances. Rash and Tariq learn Yasmin has told the police that Rash saved her life and made no mention of Tariq being there. Abigail visits to thank Cam for comforting Chloe in her last moments but it does little to raise his spirits. Guest starring Nick Harris, Natalia Kostrzewa and Evija Stepnanenko
1339	4	"The Right Amount"	Steve Hughes	Ed Sellek and Poz Watson	31 August 2024	2.59
Jan and Jacob answer a call to a house where a young man has had a stroke in his room without his mother knowing. It turns out one of his online gaming friends saw and called an ambulance. With the stroke team not available, Nicole ropes in Cam, Jodie and Rida to help thrombalyse him. Cam apologises but Jodie and Rida aren't ready to forgive him yet. Nicole and Ngozi decide to forget the kiss. A young woman, Crystal, is dumped from a car and is found to have been paid for sex. Iain recognises her boyfriend Sonny as one of his attackers. He follows him home and threatens him with a baseball bat but Sonny later returns to Crystal. Iain encourages Luka to stand up to his bullies but one of them, Noah, is brought in with a suspected ruptured spleen, after Luka beat him up for tripping him, and Luka is left facing an assault charge. A boy is brought in after being given too much insulin. Dylan suspects his mother did it deliberately and asks Sophia to look into it. The boy's older brother admits his mother once gave him vitamins he didn't need that made him sleepy and decides to quit uni to keep an eye on things. Dylan asks Sophia out for a drink but the conversation is flat. Siobhan makes a failed attempt to seduce Rich. Guest starring Yanexi Enriquez, Jake Mavis and Callum Knowelden
1340	5	"The Truth Will Set You Free"	Cóilín Ó Scolaí	Isla Gray	7 September 2024	2.35
Vince, who was at a protest about petrol usage, comes in with an injured hand. His daughter Anya visits him and argues about his beliefs. He tries to set fire to her van but accidentally sets fire to himself instead. As he is being treated, she reveals she is pregnant. Siobhan sees Rich bring in Brooke, a younger colleague with an injured foot, and is convinced they're having an affair; in fact, she's the daughter of a friend. Stevie tells Siobhan about her own relationship with Rich. Nicole and Ngozi treat a fisherman who has had a heart attack and will miss his son's birthday. Nicole goes into labour in the skills lab and Tariq has to deliver the baby. Nicole needs treatment for a partially displaced placenta. An elderly husband and wife turn up; the wife has stomach pains and dies of a perforated bowel while her husband is away. He is later found dead by her side. Faith learns Luka is being suspended and accepts Iain's offer to move in. Cam runs into Bobby. Guest starring Jonathan Watson, Anthony Lewis and Oliver Ford Davies
1341	6	"Freedom"	Cóilín Ó Scolaí	Poz Watson	7 September 2024	2.36
Iain and Teddy are assigned to escort a teenage girl who has been flown into the country; she has become a figurehead for women's rights protests after her mother kept her in school but has been attacked, shot and burnt. The ambulance is rammed but the crew escape with minor injuries. The police place the department on lockdown, meaning the girl can't be taken to surgery. She berates her mother for publicising her case. She is eventually cleared after the three men behind the attack are caught. Vince has died. Jan and Jacob pick up a man who was pushed over and hit his head after his boyfriend started a fight with some homophobes. Although the couple make up, the boyfriend is arrested. Ngozi brings Rosie to Nicole; she is ready to parent the baby, who she names Nicholas. Cam patches up Bobby, who says he didn't mean to kill Jamie. Siobhan tries to have him placed under guard but Cam helps him slip away and Siobhan keeps quiet. Blake turns up, wanting to break Danielle out of jail and be a family. Jacob tricks him into handing Carter over to Jan; he panics at the sight of the police and has to be sedated. Dylan meets Sophia for a farewell drink and they kiss. Guest starring Mansi Harvey, Samila Kul and Jonathan Nyati
Special
1342	–	"All I Want for Christmas"	Steve Hughes	Erin Kubicki	21 December 2024	3.14
Jacob and Teddy arrive at what is supposed to be a single car accident to find a pile-up involving eight vehicles inside the tunnel. One of the patients, a van driver, has his grown-up daughter with him and needs a transfusion. The daughter is confused and Jacob initially thinks she is concussed but Rash later learns she has early-onset dementia. Dylan agrees to look after the family dog while the father is in hospital. Another driver was on his way to see his sons at a service station to give them their Christmas presents, since his ex-wife won't allow him in the house. His ex-wife arrives and reveals his sister died of hepatitis C, contracted from a blood transfusion decades earlier. He eventually agrees to the transfusion but the hospital's stocks have run out and, with the roads made dangerous by ice, Iain has to act as a courier to retrieve more supplies. He crashes on the way back, having to run the rest of the way. The patient is saved and his ex-wife invites him to spend Christmas with them despite having a new boyfriend. Stevie suspects Leah, a six-year-old girl who needed a transfusion for anaemia, has leukaemia and has to tell her mother Adele at Christmas. Iain gives Leah an electronic game he had previously collected for Luka. Guest starring Tristan Sturrock, Katy Carmichael and Valerie Antwi Note: The episode is interspersed with testimony of people's real-life experiences of blood donation.
Public Property
1343	7	"Off Duty"	Suri Krishnamma	Lindsey Alford and Hilary Frankland	28 December 2024	3.12
A video of Jodie, Rida and Cam messing about in uniform goes viral and earns them a ticking off from Siobhan. Jodie helps Stevie look after a little girl who has had an asthma attack and signs of old injuries. Although the mother objects to Jodie after recognising her from the video, she is instrumental in working out the girl has PKU. A patient with a cut arm that she spoke to earlier starts fitting and has to be treated in Resus. Iain and Faith hear Luka won't be prosecuted and Faith sets about organising a party for his birthday. Jan tells a group of trainee paramedics about the public needing to always trust them. One of them, Indie Jankowski, asks to do her third year training at Holby. Dylan takes Jodie out for dinner to give her advice about her career but she feels betrayed on learning Max asked him to help her. A car crashes into the restaurant; the driver, Aaron, was trying to get his wife Thea to hospital after she went into labour. Thea has a head injury and, after a resuscitation attempt fails, Dylan performs an emergency caesarean, reluctantly letting Jodie assist even though she has been drinking. Thea is declared dead in Resus. Guest starring Allyson Ava-Brown, Omolabake Jolaoso and Norman Murray
1344	8	"On Trial"	Suri Krishnamma	Lindsey Alford and Hilary Frankland	4 January 2025	<3.10
Jodie tries to support Aaron through being a single parent to baby Elsie. Dylan lies to Siobhan and Stevie about how much Jodie had to drink but they later hear there will be a police investigation. Teddy is called out to a stampede at a night club after a woman, Cara, was stabbed in the neck. Jacob finds a man with a head injury nearby and Cara's girlfriend Laila identifies him as the attacker. Stevie and Faith discover the man and Cara committed a notorious crime when they were thirteen and were given new identities on their release. Laila leaves when Cara admits who she really is. Rash clashes with surgeon Sean Redmond, who turns out to be Tariq's housemate. Rash meets his uncle Kareem, Tariq's father, who has had a fall; it turns out he has cancer and hasn't told Tariq. Nicole returns from maternity leave and treats a student who injured his arm in the crush. His older girlfriend, a mature student, has internal injuries. He is shocked when her daughter turns up and is the same age as him with a young daughter, but they all make peace with the situation. Faith returns home to find no-one turned up for Luka's party. Ngozi is planning to go back to Nigeria but, on hearing Obi is happy there without her, changes her mind. She and Nicole kiss again. Guest starring Frances McNamee, Amanda Bright and Anand Toora
1345	9	"Bite the Bullet"	Paul Murphy	Rachel Harper	11 January 2025	2.99
Indie lies about having passed her cardiac module prior to her first shift. She, Iain and Teddy are called out to a gang shooting which has left one youth dead and another injured. Indie tricks him into surrendering his weapon by pretending he will have to have his leg amputated otherwise. She finds a 10-year-old boy has also been injured in the crossfire and the boy's mother tries to get the survivor to talk to the police. Luka accidentally shuts Faith's hand in a cupboard prior to a meeting with the social worker. Faith finds old acquaintance Astrid in hospital with heart troubles brought on by drug use. Faith tries to get her to go to a narcotics anonymous meeting but she refuses when she learns Faith isn't going. At the meeting, Luka chooses to live with his grandmother. Sean learns of Kareem's cancer when he sees Rash accompanying him to chemotherapy. Aaron brings Essie in on the day of Tina's funeral and Jodie makes sure she's seen quickly. Against advice, Jodie goes to the wake and has sex with Aaron afterwards, with him picking up on her reference to Dylan making a choice. Guest starring Immanuel Yeboah, Jensen Clayden and Laura Bayston
1346	10	"Defamation"	Paul Murphy	Erin Kubicki	18 January 2025	<2.77
Teddy and Iain attend a crash where they have to remove a young woman from a vehicle. Her boyfriend is too close to the vehicle when it explodes and his ear drums are damaged, leaving him with deafness that could be permanent. He ends the relationship while he comes to terms with it. Jacob and Indie go to a house where the landlord was attacked by the tenant's dog after entering the house to ask about non-payment of rent. The tenant, who suffered from PTSD, is found dead. Jacob asks Sophia to get Blake day release on learning he has been self-harming but Blake refuses to go with him. Rash and Tariq treat a little girl with measles encephalitis. Her mother insists she was immunised but her father admits he didn't take her after she got upset. Rash and Kareem learn his tumour has shrunk but he needs surgery. Rash invites Kareem and Tariq for dinner but it descends into an argument. Ngozi worries Nicole has post-partum depression. She collapses and Siobhan diagnoses her with anaemia. Aaron makes a complaint about Dylan and tells Jodie that if she doesn't back him up, he'll write an article revealing their relationship. Stevie takes statements of support from several staff, including Jodie, but learns Dylan lied about how much Jodie had to drink. Guest starring Corinne Furman, Sean Huddlestan and Aaron Sidwell
1347	11	"Precipice"	Jamie Annett	Mark Catley	25 January 2025	2.98
Stevie and Iain are attending HEMS training together and find Rich there. Stevie is considering a permanent position. They are assigned a job abseiling down a cliff with a stretcher, but when a rope breaks and the other one isn't enough to support them both, Iain cuts through his and deliberately falls. Stevie and Rich search for him but have to give up when Stevie injures her leg. Training leader Marilyn finds him and he is soon recovering in hospital. He tells Stevie he's going to ask Faith to marry him. Teddy and Indie pick up a young woman with heart problems and Indie has to confess to not having passed her cardiac module. The young man with her eventually explains they were taking part in a medical trial with weight loss pills. Aaron's article names Dylan but not Jodie. Nicole treats a patient who does overseas volunteer work, who may have picked up an infectious disease in Chad. His son visits him; he didn't know he was back in the country and has been looking after his mother, who has dementia, alone. The patient explains his wife no longer recognises him, only their son. Nicole visits Rosie and Nicholas and sees Rosie has a rash, giving her a prescription for it. However, to Ngozi she looks fine. Guest starring Michele Moran, Dan Mazhindu and Howard Ward
1348	12	"Freefall"	Jamie Annett	Isla Gray	1 February 2025	3.07
Stefan, a man who fainted in the gym, is brought in. His girlfriend Vanessa is frustrated to learn he has been taking steroids to counter a low sperm count while they've been trying for a baby. Rosie comes in having had an allergic reaction to the antibiotics Nicole gave her. Siobhan, Sophia and Ngozi realise Nicole does have post-partum psychosis after all. Convinced Nicholas has made Rosie in, Nicole takes him and tries to give him to Vanessa before Ngozi and Sophia take charge of the situation. Teddy, Indie and Jacob are called out to a man who is trying to run the restaurant he inherited from his sister and has got impaled on a hook in the cold room. Indie accidentally shuts herself in with the patient and has to treat him on her own until Jacob uses the ambulance to pull the door off. Having earlier hidden from bailiffs, Indie returns home to find she has been evicted and her belongings, including her grandmother's ashes, left outside. Astrid turns up at Faith's house and she lets her stay the night. Dylan is told by Detective Constable Bell that Aaron has made a complaint against him and he will have to attend a police interview. A young man with spinal injuries from a motorbike accident is admitted; he tells Dylan he took the bike off his dad so he wouldn't ride it while drunk. Dylan stays with him when it turns out the injury could be permanent, missing the police interview. Sophia tells him she's pregnant and he admits he's not sure he's ready to be a father. After the shift, Bell turns up at his barge to arrest him on suspicion of manslaughter. Guest starring Me'sha Bryan, Joshua Osei and Kammy Darweish
1349	13	"Out of Time"	Jordan Hogg	Erin Kubicki	8 February 2025	2.90
Dylan is interrogated by Bell while another detective, James, asks questions around the hospital. Jodie tells him about sleeping with Aaron but it leads to her evidence being rejected. Dylan is released on bail and suspended until the investigation is concluded. He tells Sophia he's ready to be a father but she has already booked an abortion and arranged a transfer to St James'. Indie has spent the night sleeping in an ambulance prior to her first shift in the call centre. She gets talking to an elderly woman who has had a fall and is left on the floor for hours. She turns out to have haemorrhaging and is unsuitable for surgery. Indie sits with her while she dies. Rash and Sean see Kareem off for surgery which reveals he has an abscess on his liver which will need further treatment. Rash reveals the truth to Tariq but it leads to another argument and Tariq revealing Rash's suicide attempt. Teddy and Jacob pick up a new father with cardiac problems and a policewoman he headbutted. Stevie and Cameron treat a youth, Ben, who cuts his hands in a fall. He turns out to be Siobhan and Rich's son. Stevie defends him to them and Siobhan agrees to listen to his plan to quit uni and go travelling. Stevie and Rich kiss. Guest starring Glen Wallace, Laya Lewis and Ali Barouti
1350	14	"Jodie"	Jordan Hogg	Claire Miller	15 February 2025	2.99
January 2020: Jodie is working as a student midwife at Brackwell Maternity Ward, where matron Maria informs her and her friend Vicky there is one permanent place available after they've finished their rotation. Her mother Rachel is being looked after at home by oncology nurse Sheila. Jodie meets with Ali, who is experienced discomfort with her pregnancy, but Maria insists she send her home and ignores her calls. She helps new consultant Henry look after a recovering addict whose breach birth turns for a natural delivery although the baby needs surgery for a cleft lip. She also helps with a forcep delivery on Imani, who is in advanced labour. Jodie learns Rachel has stopped her chemotherapy, resigned to die. She leaves, angry, and Rachel dies while she is at work. She starts an affair with married Henry which he ends when people find out. Ali comes back in with an infection and the baby is left deaf and with brain damage. Jodie is used as a scapegoat, even after she works out Imani has a haemorrhage. Vicky is given the permanent job and Jodie is forced to resign in return for a reference. Guest starring Max Brown, Laurie Brett and Cathy Murphy
1351	15	"Brace, Brace, Brace"	Matthew Evans	Simon Norman	22 February 2025	3.01
The ambulance call centre hear a report of a plane crashing. Ambulance and fire crews are despatched. Stevie is interviewing for the clinical lead position but is sent to take charge until Dylan can come in. Siobhan insists Sophia stay behind on her last day but refuses to let Jodie work while under investigation. A young girl is brought in with a chunk of metal in her shoulder that requires surgery, along with her mother. The mother's boyfriend later turns up and admits he was one of the first off the plane, leaving them behind. Indie meets with a stewardess that she previously spoke to on the phone, who will probably lose an eye as a result of being pushed over by passengers and also has an abdominal injury. Kareem tries to discharge himself but collapses with Rash and Tariq having to treat him for a pulmonary embolism. Faith finds Astrid has used her pass to access the drugs room and orders her out. She learns one passenger was under arrest but places him under guard instead of calling his wife and son. He later needs emergency treatment after removing his tourniquet. Faith returns home to find Astrid has trashed the place and left some drugs for her. Jacob collects Blake from the psych hospital. There are reports of an explosion; Stevie fears a badly burned fireman is Rich but Siobhan realises it's a colleague of his, Andy. Rich is then brought in with lung damage and internal injuries. He tells Siobhan he loves Stevie before dying in Resus. Guest starring Natasha Alderslade, Jack Pierce and Chris Donald
1352	16	"Unearthed"	Matthew Evans	Matthew McDevitt	1 March 2025	2.84
Yvonne makes Stevie acting clinical lead while Siobhan is on leave and asks her to investigate Faith over the missing drugs. Faith walks out after a locker search and throws the drugs away. She learns Luka is missing and finds him at a train yard, convincing him to return to her and Iain. A father and son are brought in after the father fell down some stairs. Stevie and Cam are suspicious and learn the father was chasing the son after finding evidence he was stealing. Social services are called. Sean turns up with a cut arm caused by his superior, Russell Whitelaw, who collapsed with heart troubles during a surgery. Sean and Rida kiss. Ngozi tells Cam that Nicole is being discharged soon but she is going to Nigeria to see Obi; Cam suggests Obi comes to her instead. A young woman is brought in with an allergic reaction. Her father is horrified to learn she slept with a man who thought she was twenty when she's actually twenty. He recognises Jodie's name from a podcast and argues with her. Jodie goes to Dylan's barge drunk where she misreads the signals and offers herself to him before leaving humiliated. Guest starring Gareth Jewell, Caleb Isaac Parfitt and Jordan Wicks
1353	17	"Just Like You"	George Siougas	Toby Walton	8 March 2025	2.85
Teddy and Indie are caught up in a riot caused by local football ultras, during which father and son police officers are injured. The father needs surgery; his son admits he hates the job but doesn't want to quit because it would disappoint him. Dylan is back at work after being cleared: The investigation showed Thea died as a result of the crash but also showed genetic mutations. Jodie helps Aaron get Elsie tested but agrees they shouldn't see each other again. Siobhan is criticised for not arranging extra security. Old patient Dane, who was left deaf by an accident and was caught up in the riot, listens to the podcast after a comment from Siobhan and threatens Dylan with a scalpel, believing he made a mistake with him. He accidentally cuts his arm before collapsing from a pericardial effusion with Jodie helping Dylan operate on him. Teddy and Indie are called out to a kebab shop where a troublesome customer has hit his head but is refusing to leave and helping himself to food; Indie talks him down. Iain proposes to Faith who, after initial panic, accepts. Indie learns the friend she is staying with is kicking her out, while Cam and Rida accompany Jodie in visiting her mother's grave. Guest starring Sean Huddlestan, Bradley Wilkinson and Adrian Osman
Internal Affairs
1354	18	"Everything Changes"	George Siougas	Poz Watson	15 March 2025	2.68
Jodie is back at work after being given a warning, while Nicole is now doing a surgical rotation with Russell, prompting Dylan to tell Tariq to step up. Army medic Flynn Byron is meant to be spending time with wife Claire and daughters Millie and Poppy before being deployed but sneaks away to meet Amber, an army colleague he had an affair with. He tells her things are over. She gets out of the car on a blind bed and is hit by another vehicle. Flynn is injured getting the young son of the other driver to safety. Faith has to work out the boy's medication for Tariq but Tariq takes the credit with Dylan. Flynn, who was at medical school with Stevie, has to alert Tariq to the fact Amber is about to arrest and she dies in Resus. Russell, who turns out to be Claire's father, sees Amber has Flynn's coat and realises they were having an affair but agrees to keep quiet. Stevie takes a pregnancy test which is positive. 2 months later, Ngozi goes to an Alcoholics Anonymous meeting but leaves when she sees Dylan there. A recovering Flynn tells Stevie he's the new clinical lead and will start in a week. Guest starring Sophie Melville, Peace Oseyenum and Irfan Damani
1355	19	"Civil War"	Judith Dine	Michelle Lipton	22 March 2025	2.72
Flynn starts his first shift and finds ambulances queued up outside. He introduces a system where patients are taken up to wards as soon as they are ready, which Tariq approves of. Iain finds Indie sleeping in an ambulance. They pick up Gloria, an elderly woman who has tried extracting her own tooth but ended up with bleeding as a result of warfarin. Tariq tries to send her to a ward but she is sent back down since there's no-one to look after her. As a result, no-one is doing proper observation and she arrests and dies. Cam gives Indie some money Gloria left for a flat deposit. A teenage rugby player is brought in after being injured playing. His teacher ends up in Resus with heart problems and it transpires the player had been selling her his ADHD medication. Jan and Teddy bring in a farmer whose wife claims he was attacked by a bull, although all evidence suggests he was hit by a car. They later find a man with learning difficulties who has crashed a car nearby. He reveals the farmers found him sleeping in a barn and kept him prisoner, forcing him to work for his food. The farmers are arrested. Russell forces Flynn to cancel the new policy. Ngozi's flat has a carbon monoxide leak so Nicole suggests she stay with her so Obi can visit. Flynn blames Tariq for Gloria's death and tries to place him on administrative duties pending an investigation. Instead, he resigns, taking a job in Dubai. Stevie tells Faith about her pregnancy, but when Faith and Flynn perform an ultrasound on her, they find a mass instead of a baby. Guest starring Sunny Ormonde, Kyron Wilson and Esther O'Casey
1356	20	"Stalemate"	Judith Dine	Isla Gray	29 March 2025	2.96
Stevie hands a patient with a cut arm over to Dylan, before meeting with Dr Priya Rowlands, who says they won't know if the mass is benign or not before it's removed. She later learns the patient she met earlier arrested in theatre. Rida meets a teenage girl who wants the morning after pill but she suspects she has appendicitis. A locum dismisse it but Rida convinces Russell and Sean to have a look and they confirm it. Russell suggests Rida apply to be a nurse practitioner. Nicole and Ngozi argue over the fact Ngozi is insisting on separate rooms while Obi visits. Jacob and Indie treat Samuel, an inmate who was stabbed at the prison. Indie keeps quiet about the fact he is her father but later visits him. A stroke patient is brought in with irreversible brain damage. Stevie uses expensive drugs to keep him alive so his wife can say goodbye. Flynn supports her and Russell tells him there is a freeze on agency nurses. Stevie returns home unaware someone is photographing her. Guest starring Peter Ivatts, Deirdra Morris and Annie Taylor
1357	21	"Enemy Lines"	Karl Neilson	Michelle Lipton	5 April 2025	2.75
Iain, Teddy and Indie come across the aftermath of a car accident which has seen one of a pair of brothers sever his arm. Rida is now working with Russell and Sean, and convinces Russell to treat the other brother for a perforated bowel, even though it ends any chance of the arm being reattached. Afterwards, Rida manages to get the arguing brothers to put aside their differences; the older one gave up school when their father went to prison and is trying to do better for his younger brother. Flynn finds a number of treatments have failed as a result of substandard equipment, with Siobhan and Rash stopping him from blaming Cam. They treat one of the affected patients for suspected sepsis. Flynn misses Millie's parents' evening to speak with counciller Anna Mills about increasing funding. Indie learns Cam has a spare room at his house and tries to use her money for a deposit but ends up having to give it to Samuel instead, leaving her sleeping rough. Stevie sees a hooded man watching her flat and learns someone has been inside. Guest starring Cassius Hackforth, Max Runham and Terence Booth
1358	22	"Collateral Damage"	Karl Neilson	Michelle Lipton	12 April 2025	2.88
Stevie's home is invaded by police officers after her stalker tipped them off that there were drugs there. She later gets an alert on her door cam to a break-in and finds it is Ben, who found out about the affair after hearing Siobhan and Rich arguing. Stevie takes him to Siobhan, who promises the incidents will stop. A man is brought in with glass imbedded in his neck from falling on a fish tank. The staff are suspicious when he argues with his teenage son and has old injuries. It is revealed the boy did push him but the injuries were caused by his ex-wife. Jan warns call centre staff that they aren't meeting targets but supports Indie staying on the line to talk a woman, Alison, through giving birth. A patient, Eddie, has been hit in the armpit by a high speed stone and needs surgery. Anna visits with a defibrilator donated by charity and Flynn tells her a theatre is lying empty because there's no staff. She arranges a meeting for funding. Alison turns out to be Eddie's wife. A man is brought in after coming off his motorbike following the funeral of the love of his life. Ngozi is sympathetic until it turns out the woman was married to his brother, and after the funeral he beat his brother unconscious and left him for dead. Ngozi admits to Obi that she and Nicole are a couple when he asks her straight out. Guest starring Nicholas Clarke, Will Bagnall and Connor McIntyre
1359	23	"Fight Bite"	Paul Murphy	Poz Watson	19 April 2025	2.89
Teddy and Iain rush to the docks where two schoolgirls, Lena and Carly, fell into the water after being chased by the police for shoplifting. Carly is declared dead in hospital after her parents Ashley and Kerry arrive. Lena reveals they were stealing tampons because Carly thought her parents couldn't afford them. A vigil is held at the docks which Anna attends but the presence of police, including Catherine, an officer involved in the pursuit, and Ashley's arrival sees it escalate to a riot. Flynn attends the scene where Catherine is injured by a molotov cocktail before Kerry manages to talk the crowd down. On his return, he finds Lena has died of a pulmonary embolism and gets into a furious confrontation with Dylan. Rida subtly quizzes Sean about the list; he sees he ghosted a nurse he was dating on realising it wasn't working out. Stevie, Siobhan and Indie help a young homeless man who was attacked on the streets. Rida talks to Georgina, a young woman in for a gastric band operation. She decides to go ahead with it but the operation is cancelled anyway when Siobhan finds Stevie collapsed in the toilets bleeding. The mass is now obstructing her bowel and Russell needs to operate immediately. Guest starring Nicole Sargent, Mariella Hazar and Candis Nergaard
1360	24	"Plan B"	Cóilín Ó Scolaí	Claire Miller	26 April 2025	2.80
Jan tells the call centre staff they are under investigation. Indie takes a call from a woman whose date has locked himself in the kitchen having a psychotic break. She stops them from breaching by downgrading the case when it turns out he has taken a steroid overdose. At the hospital, he admits to Rash and Jodie that he took extra Crohn's disease medication and admits the truth to his date. Indie later gives a night shift supermarket worker a low priority when she calls complaining of dizziness and vertigo but by the time Teddy and Jacob arrives hours later she has had a heart attack and needs to be resuscitated. Jan tells Indie to concentrate on her assessments. Flynn stays on to treat casualties from the riot. Stevie goes into surgery where it becomes clear her growth is invasive and probably cancerous and they need to perform a hysterectomy. During a break, Russell holds Rida in place next to him, causing her to panic and have to leave. Stevie comes round and is uncomfortable when Cara, the patient on the next bed, is visited by her daughter Olive. Guest starring Bella Band, Emile John and Anne Bird
1361	25	"Paper Planes"	Cóilín Ó Scolaí	Al Smith	3 May 2025	2.53
Indie is taking driver training when she stumbles across a car driven by a 13-year-old boy that has crashed into a tree. She stops to help but fails her test as a result. The boy admits he was trying to get insulin for his mother who is in crisis and Jacob and Teddy are sent to pick her up. Indie tells Jan about sleeping rough and Jan offers her a place to stay. Jan brings in Obi who has been in a fight. He tells Ngozi another boy asked if he wanted to kiss him and describes himself as "normal" unlike her. Dylan asks Ngozi about seeing her at the meeting and she says she hasn't had a drink since coming to the UK. Rida confides in Jodie and Cam who advise her to report Russell but she is unable to speak to Flynn. Dr Rowlands tells Stevie that her mass was cancerous; the operation removed it all but she still needs chemotherapy. She learns Cara's cancer is terminal and she is going to tell Olive when she gets home, but she collapses on being discharged and is rushed to the ED. Olive runs off on learning the truth and Stevie sits with Cara as she dies, then finds Olive and takes her to see her before her father picks her up. After arguing with Faith, Stevie decides to go home alone rather than staying with her as planned. Guest starring Emet Yah-Khai and Andrew Finch
1362	26	"Save Yourself"	Sean Healy	Poz Watson	10 May 2025	2.65
Obi is rushed into hospital after suffering a fit. Dylan diagnoses a contusion on the brain which should heal itself. Obi tells Ngozi he wants to go home but she thinks they're better off there. Russell humiliates Nicole when she turns up late as a result. Rida asks Siobhan about returning to the ED but learns there's no vacancies. She gets Nicole to add her to a group chat about surgeons not to work with, then makes it public. When Russell continues to dismiss her, Nicole resigns from his department. A young man, Liam, rings emergency services saying his house is on fire and his girlfriend Sarah is upstairs. He carries her out as Iain and Teddy arrives but goes back for an engagement ring and is badly burned. When Sarah comes round, she says Liam started the fire and has been stalking her since they went on one date. Liam has internal bleeding and dies in surgery. His father admits he has been obsessed with girls before. Claire chides Flynn for missing Poppy's school play. Rash treats Libby, a teenage girl who has been self-harming. She and her foster mother Lisa ask him to keep it quiet, worried they will be separated, but Flynn reports it. Indie meets up with Samuel who has just been released from prison and helps him squat in Sarah's house while she is in hospital. Guest starring Darcy Streamer, Olivia Williamson and Tom Anderson
1363	27	"For the Record"	Sean Healy	Rachel Harper	24 May 2025	2.45
Flynn goes to a budget meeting with Anna only to find she has been stabbed by an assailant who blamed her for the riots. He treats her until the ambulance arrives. Sean works out Rida was the one who made the list public. When he gets in trouble operating on a patient with a bowel problem, Rida calls Russell to take over and Sean tells him what he's learned. Russell needs to operate on Anna, who recovers and hears her attacker has been arrested. She tells Flynn she's going to resign to spend time with her family. Rash and Cam treat a Brownies leader hearing a clicking sound who turns out to have a spider in her ear. Rida tries to record a confession from Russell but he snatches the phone off her, tearing her head scarf off in the process. Flynn walks in on the aftermath and Russell threatens to tell Claire about his affairs if he says anything. Rida tells Sean to stay away from her. Libby is brought in with a scalded arm, accompanied by a dismissive teacher, Bruce. She says she got it fighting with another girl but it turns out to have been provoked by Bruce calling her unlovable. Rash and Lisa convince her to report him. Flynn backs them up, then reports Russell. Guest starring Rich Keeble, Philip Martin Brown and Lizzie Muncey
1364	28	"Dutch Courage"	David Kester	Mark Catley	31 May 2025	2.48
Nicole and Jodie treat a farm who had his leg trapped in a poachers' snare and cut his abdomen on barbed wire while trying to find out who poisoned his cattle. Nicole has to cut the wire off when Russell is delayed. The farmer works out his wife poisoned the cows to try and force him to sell the farm but he refuses. Ngozi treats a young mother who has septic shock from recently giving birth. She is living in her car and left the newborn there. Indie manages to retrieve the baby. A man who is a member of the Royal Voluntary Service brings in his teenage daughter who has an ectopic pregnancy. When he hears her blood group, he realises he isn't her biological father but Flynn convinces him to support her anyway. Russell threatens to expose Flynn's affairs unless he backs him up regarding Rida. Instead, Flynn tells HR representative Christine Barker it wasn't an accident and confesses his affairs to Claire. Stevie is reluctant to attend Iain and Faith's wedding. Iain visits her and she kisses him but quickly regrets it, attending the wedding. Martin is beaten up by men he owes money to. Indie finds him robbing Jan's house during the wedding reception but leaves and lets him ransack the place. Ngozi drinks shots at the wedding reception. Guest starring Marie Critchley, Sion Tudor Owen and Kate Humbles
1365	29	"Non-Disclosure"	David Kester	Simon Norman	7 June 2025	2.60
Russell stops Flynn seeing Claire and the girls, saying he is taking a lecturing job in London and they are going with him. There is an outbreak of food poisoning at the hospital. Jan and Indie are called out to the restaurant that was the source where owner Reed has had an argument with his brother Steve, the chef, who has fallen on a knife. Steve tells Reed he is quitting. Stevie meets Leah, the girl she diagnosed with cancer at Christmas, while undergoing chemotherapy and learns she has been given the all-clear. Christine tells Rida that Russell has accused her of incompetence and offers a deal where she is given a pay-off in return for signing a non-disclosure agreement and Russell takes early retirement. Jan and Indie pick up Justine, a woman having a heart attack. When she deteriorates, Indie is distracted and crashes into the department, injuring Reed. Justine dies and Jan has to tell her son. Indie tells Jan the truth about the robbery. Russell and Rida operate on Reed in Resus. Sean tells Rida about Russell's new job. Rida interrupts Russell's farewell to accuse him of sexually assaulting her and preying on and bullying his staff, which Christine allows to be live streamed. Russell is denounced online and has his job offer withdrawn. Claire decides to stay in Holby so Flynn can have access to his daughters. Dylan realises Ngozi is hungover and advised her to confide in Nicole but Nicole tells her and Obi to move out. Guest starring Robin Morrissey, Alastair Coughlan and Fiona Mulvaney
Supply and Demand
1366	30	"Episode 1"	Duncan Foster	Toby Walton	14 June 2025	2.59
Jan tells Indie there isn't a place available for her at Holby when she finishes her training. Iain takes Indie with him to an accident at the docks but they leave a box of atropine behind. One worker has had a pallet fall on him and another is stuck up in a train with heart troubles. While waiting for Tim Matthews and the HART personnel, Iain climbs up to treat the patient and has to mix an adrenaline solution to replace the missing atropine. Jan is unhappy when he lies about what happened to the drugs and Iain tells Faith he has applied for a position at HART. Indie finds the dolls in the fallen crate are full of drugs and the police are alerted. Dylan and Rash have to treat a cystic fibrosis patient without salbutamol; pharmacist Sunny Callahan has said it is only to be used for severe asthma patients, since supplies are low. She finds some spare but Flynn is distracted by a visit from Poppy and Millie and doesn't sign the purchase order in time. The girls are left in the office until they call Claire to pick them up. Rash lets the patient's boyfriend, who also has cystic fibrosis, in to see her wearing PPE. Flynn treats a skateboarder who hit his head and has breathing problems from vaping, having to use other medication. Nicole and Ngozi argue while treating a patient, who isn't given the required scans and turns out to have an aortic dissection. Ngozi denies responsibility with Nicole suspecting she's hungover. Two weeks later, Iain and Indie try to treat an overdose patient with naloxone but it doesn't work on the drugs taken, while Jan receives multiple calls about similar cases. Guest starring Sonny Michael Chohan, Obi Laughton-Olofero and Nicole Sawyerr
1367	31	"Episode 2"	Duncan Foster	Erin Kubicki	21 June 2025	2.44
Stevie returns to work to find the department full of dying overdose patients. The heroin has been cut with something, meaning naloxone is ineffective. Rash tries to help one addict but her boyfriend convinces her to leave, saying they'll give up but not yet. She is later brought back in and dies. Stevie gets involved with an Afghanistan War veteran who takes drugs to cope with persistent head pains. After she works out the heroin has been cut with warfarin and comes up with a treatment, Flynn lets her run a CT on the patient who turns out to have a TBI. She is annoyed when Flynn then tries to kiss her. Jodie tries to get Rash to ask Sunny out. Teddy decides to apply to HART as well. Nicole treats Maggie, a patient with COPD who had a fall. She is being looked after by her foster daughter Cassie and it is revealed she once fostered Nicole. The staff try to treat her without salbutamol but she has an allergic reaction and dies. Cassie is kept at the hospital since she is about to turn eighteen, at which point she can be sent to a hostel. She asks Nicole if she can move in with her but Nicole refuses, saying she doesn't want chaos. Guest starring Luke Azille, Sandra Maitland and Mark Meadows
1368	32	"Episode 3"	Paul Riordan	Michelle Lipton	28 June 2025	2.37
The staff are setting up special cubicles for overdoses. Flynn rejects the idea of giving naloxone syringes to drug addicts as a precaution but Dylan gives one to Cleo, a young pregnant woman who intends to give up her baby, against his wishes. Ngozi has spent the night with a strange man and finds a young girl who has taken some heroin left in a playground. She rushes her into hospital and saves her but Dylan insists on breathalysing Ngozi, finding she is just under the limit and putting her on admin. She learns Obi hasn't turned up at school. Rida starts back in the ED as a band 6 nurse, meaning she is now giving orders to Jodie and Cam, which they all struggle to adjust to. Iain and Teddy begin their HART training with Tim. Iain passes a first test by realising they are meant to search a smoke-filled building for extra casualties, but is distracted by a phone call saying his mother is dying in a hospice and misses the instructions for a later test, exposing himself to gas rather than changing the filter in a mask. He is narrowly allowed to stay on. A patient with pancreatic cancer needs pancreatin so his body can process vitamins but Sunny says the only supplies available are in Wolverhampton. The man's teenage daughter drives there herself to collect it. Joel, a patient who's been stabbed, is found to have drugs on him. A friend of his, Lewis, is brought in having also been stabbed trying to avenge him. Joel tells Flynn he is an undercover police officer and Lewis could lead him to a breakthrough, but Ngozi mentions it in front of Lewis, leading to Lewis moving, dislodging the knife and bleeding to death in Resus. Joel is annoyed that Flynn seems more bothered about the case than the death. Dylan catches Ngozi drinking and tells Siobhan before taking her to an AA meeting. Guest starring Matthew Carter, Daisy Campbell and Chadrack Mbuini
1369	33	"Episode 4"	Paul Riordan	Claire Miller	12 July 2025	2.30
A young man is brought in with hypothermia after being left in an ice bath. His mother initially claims it was to help with exam stress, but when his boyfriend turns up, it becomes clear he was being tortured by a "doctor" for conversion therapy. He tells his mother he isn't going back and she walks out. The experience prompts Ngozi to talk in an AA meeting about how her drinking was prompted by having to hide her sexuality. Blake comes in worried about Carter and then has a seizure. Jacob admits to getting his medication off the internet. Sunny can only suggest an expensive private prescription. Rash learns she has a son, Jake, and they arrange a date. Indie is applying for a job in Sheffield and Cam helps her prepare. Iain and Teddy are picking up a patient who has just arrived back in the country with suspected Marburg virus. They will provide medical care with Tim as escort. Teddy thinks he doesn't have Marburg when the symptoms differ and breaks quarantine to treat him, causing Iain to be splattered with saliva. It turns out he does have Marburg but has also swallowed packets of drugs and is taken to Holby for treatment. His wife explains they were threatened at their hotel into smuggling the drugs in. Iain has to remain in quarantine. Tim tries to debrief Teddy but he resigns and later suffers chest pains. Guest starring John Bowler, Caroline O'Neill and Emma Cater
