= All I Want for Christmas (Casualty) =

Special television episode

- Casualty episode
- Episode no.: Series 39; Episode 7
- Directed by: Steve Hughes
- Written by: Erin Kubicki
- Original air date: 21 December 2024
- Running time: 47 minutes

Guest appearance
- List

Episode chronology
← Previous "Freedom"	Next → "Off Duty"
- Casualty series 39

"All I Want for Christmas" is a special Christmas episode of British medical drama television series Casualty, first broadcast on 21 December 2024 on BBC One and BBC iPlayer. It is the seventh episode of the thirty-ninth series and the 1342nd episode overall.

Set over Christmas Eve and Christmas Day, the episode explores the impact of a blood shortage at Holby City Hospital's Emergency Department, worsened by an increasing number of casualties from a multiple vehicle collision. In a change from its usual format, the episode is intertwined with cutaways of real-life stories and interviews from people who work in, and have been impacted by, blood donation in the United Kingdom.

== Plot ==
Jacob and Teddy arrive at what is supposed to be a single car accident to find a pile-up involving eight vehicles inside the tunnel. One of the patients, a van driver, has his grown-up daughter with him and needs a transfusion. The daughter is confused and Jacob initially thinks she is concussed but Rash later learns she has early-onset dementia. Dylan agrees to look after the family dog while the father is in hospital. Another driver was on his way to see his sons at a service station to give them their Christmas presents, since his ex-wife won't allow him in the house. His ex-wife arrives and reveals his sister died of hepatitis C, contracted from a blood transfusion decades earlier. He eventually agrees to the transfusion but the hospital's stocks have run out and, with the roads made dangerous by ice, Iain has to act as a courier to retrieve more supplies. He crashes on the way back, having to run the rest of the way. The patient is saved and his ex-wife invites him to spend Christmas with them despite having a new boyfriend. Stevie suspects Leah, a six-year-old girl who needed a transfusion for anaemia, has leukaemia and has to tell her mother Adele at Christmas. Iain gives Leah an electronic game he had previously collected for Luka.

== Cast ==
The cast for the episode is from the BBC episode website.

- Stevie Nash - Elinor Lawless
- Iain Dean - Michael Stevenson
- Faith Cadogan - Kirsty Mitchell
- Dylan Keogh - William Beck
- Siobhan McKenzie - Melanie Hill
- Jacob Masters - Charles Venn
- Theodore 'Teddy' Gowan - Milo Clarke
- Rida Amaan - Sarah Seggari
- Cam Mickelthwaite - Barney Walsh
- Jodie Whyte - Anna Chell
- Rashid Masum- Neet Mohan
- Ngozi Okoye - Adesuwa Oni
- Jan Jenning - Di Botcher
- Natalia Malinovsky - Zoe Brough
- Ana Malinovsky - Isla Merrick-Lawless
- Luka Malinovsky - Tom Mulheron
- Dominic Ryder - Tristan Sturrock
- Shelley Ryder - Katy Carmichael
- Milo Ryder - Jacob Smith
- Robin Ryder - Noah Smith
- Adele Thompson - Lucy-Jo Hudson
- Leah Thompson - Mia Millichamp-Long
- Issa Reid - Valerie Antwi
- Andrei Reid - Joseph Charles
- Police Officer - Rhiannon Oliver
- Nurse - Mattie Packer

== Production ==
The pile-up scenes were filmed in Newport over two days, with a tunnel being created with smoke and fog effects.

The Welsh Blood Service assisted producers in research for the episode. The service's Headquarters in Talbot Green was used as the filming location for the opening scenes with Stevie Nash donating blood.

== Promotion ==
The first trailer for the episode featured at the end of the previous episode, "Freedom", which aired on 7 September 2024. It featured the department covered in snow, with an unknown hand removing a blood bag from a refrigerator, with the song "Fairytale of New York" by The Pogues.

A second teaser trailer was released on 9 December 2024, which seemingly showed Paramedic Iain Dean crashing an ambulance on a snowy road. This led to speculation that Dean would be killed off.

== Broadcast ==
The episode was released on BBC iPlayer at 6am GMT on 21 December 2024, and aired on BBC One at 9:20pm on the same day. The episode was 47 minutes long.

== Reception ==
In an appearance on The One Show, Barney Walsh, who plays nurse Cam Mickelthwaite, described the story as "special" and that he was "really proud" of the episode.

Elinor Lawless, who plays consultant Stevie Nash, described the episode as having a "real grit and brutality". The song Fairytale of New York, which features at the start of the episode, is described by Lawless as "messy and ugly and beautiful and celebratory", which she felt were the themes of the episode. She also explains that the episode portrays well the busy nature of an emergency department during a festive period.

BBC drama's Commissioning Editor, Rebecca Ferguson, described the episode as "tense, thrilling and super-charged with emotion". Roxanne Harvey, BBC Studios Drama Production's Executive Producer, described the episode as "entertaining, thought-provoking drama at its very best".
