= Casualty series 3 =

Third series of Casualty

Casualty
- Series 3
- Starring: Susan Franklyn; Brenda Fricker; Bernard Gallagher; Julie Graham; Shaheen Khan; Paul Lacoux; Carol Leader; Geoffery Leesley; Eddie Nestor; Christopher Rozycki; Cathy Shipton; Derek Thompson; Ella Wilder
- No. of episodes: 10

Release
- Original network: BBC One
- Original release: 9 September – 4 November 1988

Series chronology
- ← Previous; Series 2 Next → Series 4

The third series of the British medical drama television series Casualty commenced airing in the United Kingdom on BBC One on 9 September 1988 and finished on 4 November 1988.

== Production ==
Geraint Morris continued as producer for this series, which consists of ten episodes, a decrease from the previous series. The broadcast of episode 7 was delayed until 5 August 1989 during a series repeat following the death of guest actor Roy Kinnear. Succeeding episodes were brought forward one week in the schedule as a result. Series 3 saw episodes move to a new Friday night slot at the later time of 9:30pm allowing some more hard hitting storylines to be covered, including a female motor mechanic paralysed from the neck down, a cot death and a teacher friend of Megan’s attacked by a group of students.

== Cast ==
=== Overview ===
The third series of Casualty features a cast of characters working in the emergency department of Holby City Hospital. The series began with 8 roles with star billing. Bernard Gallagher portrayed emergency medicine consultant Ewart Plimmer. Derek Thompson appeared as charge nurse Charlie Fairhead, whilst Brenda Fricker played state enrolled nurse Megan Roach. Cathy Shipton and Eddie Nestor starred as staff nurses Lisa "Duffy" Duffin and Cyril James. Ella Wilder and Geoffrey Leesley portrayed paramedics Shirley Franklin and Keith Cotterill. Christopher Rozycki portrayed porter Kuba Trzcinski. Brian Capron also appeared in two episodes as locum emergency medicine medical registrar Peter.

Gallagher chose to leave the show, with Ewart being killed off in episode five. Five new cast members joined the series in episode 1: Paul Lacoux as senior house officer David Rowe; Julie Graham and Shaheen Khan as student nurses Alison McGrellis and Kiran Joghill; Carol Leader as receptionist Sadie Tomkins; and Susan Franklyn as administrator Valerie Sinclair. Lacoux, Graham, Khan and Leader departed the series at its conclusion. Wilder and Rozycki also departed at the end of the series.

=== Main characters ===
- Susan Franklyn as Valerie Sinclair (from episode 1)
- Brenda Fricker as Megan Roach
- Bernard Gallagher as Ewart Plimmer (until episode 5)
- Julie Graham as Alison McGrellis (episodes 1−10)
- Shaheen Khan as Kiran Joghill (episodes 1−10)
- Paul Lacoux as David Rowe (episodes 1−10)
- Carol Leader as Sadie Tomkins (episodes 1−10)
- Geoffrey Leesley as Keith Cotterill
- Eddie Nestor as Cyril James
- Christopher Rozycki as Kuba Trzcinski (until episode 10)
- Cathy Shipton as Lisa "Duffy" Duffin
- Derek Thompson as Charlie Fairhead
- Ella Wilder as Shirley Franklin (until episode 10)

=== Guest characters ===
- Brian Capron as Peter (episodes 3 & 8)

== Episodes ==
| No. overall | No. in series | Title | Directed by | Written by | Original release date |
|---|---|---|---|---|---|
| 31 | 1 | "Welcome to Casualty" | Michael Owen Morris | David Ashton | 9 September 1988 |
It's straight in the deep end for new faces David Rowe, who has to give some despairing news and Outpatients Officer, Valerie Sinclair, who has a difficult first meeting with Ewart.
| 32 | 2 | "Desperate Odds" | Graham Theakston | Ginnie Hole | 16 September 1988 |
A social worker is assaulted while investigating the abuse of a child, David misdiagnoses a pickpocket and Duffy can't tell anyone why she's moody and withdrawn.
| 33 | 3 | "Drake's Drum" | Keith Washington | Keith Dewhurst | 23 September 1988 |
A gay vicar giving himself a false name arrives at A&E while one of his parishioners is brought in with a rare heart condition that requires a procedure in crash.
| 34 | 4 | "Absolution" | Jeremy Silberston | Wally K Daly | 30 September 1988 |
David and Charlie argue over patient confidentiality and a Priest refuses to reveal information after a suicide attempt in his church. Duffy discloses the cause of her grief.
| 35 | 5 | "Burn Out" | Michael Owen Morris | Jeremy Brock | 7 October 1988 |
The team have to deal with a young pregnant squatter, Megan's friend suffering from septic-shock after plastic surgery and a staff emergency in the newly-saved Observation Ward. Ewart collapses with another heart attack, Megan and the team are unable to save him and he dies.
| 36 | 6 | "A Quiet Night" | Graham Theakston | David Ashton | 14 October 1988 |
Megan is back at work and Valerie is shadowing the night shift but for Cyril and David the fun of ashtray hockey is soon forgotten when they are called out to a collision of two school minibuses, each packed with pupils.
| 37 | 7 | "A Wing and a Prayer" | Keith Washington | Ginnie Hole | 5 August 1989 |
There is no bed available for an elderly stroke victim brought to A&E and a foreign worker is brought in with hallucinations and a cut to his face.
| 38 | 8 | "Living Memories" | Keith Washington | Ginnie Hole | 21 October 1988 |
Valerie is doing a customer survey but the staff have to deal with 16-year-old hit and run victim, a 7-year-old with breathing difficulties and a giant, drunk rabbit.
| 39 | 9 | "Inferno" | Tim Dowd | Jeremy Brock | 28 October 1988 |
Megan wants to resign, Kuba faces the sack and Valerie tells Charlie to make savings in the department. Meanwhile, it's Bonfire Night and they face burns victims, suicide and a young girl with meningitis.
| 40 | 10 | "Caring" | Michael Owen Morris | Ginnie Hole | 4 November 1988 |
Among the patients are an arthritic suffering from hematemesis – side-effects from a drug prescribed by his GP; an old lady with scalding and a homeless punk with a chest infection. The staff find time for a wheelchair race and Charlie manages to ask Valerie out.

== Notes ==
1.Airing postponed due to death of Roy Kinnear.

== Bibliography ==
- Kingsley, Hilary (1995). Casualty: The Inside Story. Penguin Books. ISBN 0-14-024902-8.
