= Casualty series 2 =

Second series of Casualty

Casualty
- Series 2
- Starring: Lisa Bowerman; Brenda Fricker; Bernard Gallagher; Kate Hardie; Geoffery Leesley; Helena Little; Eddie Nestor; Maureen O'Brien; Robert Pugh; Debbie Roza; Christopher Rozycki; Cathy Shipton; Derek Thompson; Ella Wilder
- No. of episodes: 15

Release
- Original network: BBC One
- Original release: 12 September – 19 December 1987

Series chronology
- ← Previous; Series 1 Next → Series 3

The second series of the British medical drama television series Casualty commenced airing in the United Kingdom on BBC One on 12 September 1987 and finished on 19 December 1987.

== Production ==
While the first series of Casualty had been filmed in London, a permanent place for the Set had now been found – a warehouse in Bristol. However, accompanying the publicity for the start of the new series were comments by producer Geraint Morris that there would be no more programmes, stating quite unequivocally that: "We felt it should end on a high after thirty episodes."

Once again as the characters of Holby's A&E department battled to save their night shift on screen, off screen a similar battle was being waged – and won. After six weeks on air, the critics were finally warming to the series and there were no longer any Government complaints about content. Following the dramatic episode "Cry For Help", in which Paramedic Sandra Mute is stabbed the programme seemed to secure audiences of more than 10 million and therefore a sense of security to the programme.

An example of the series' now infamous tendency to bear similarity to real life events came during an episode where the team had to dig out bodies from a house bombed in an IRA attack. Just hours after being screened, an IRA bomb ripped through Enniskillen. It seemed that the writers had put their fingers on the country's pulse without exaggeration and from that point onwards no one dared to call it far-fetched again.

== Cast ==
=== Overview ===
The second series of Casualty features a cast of characters working in the emergency department of Holby City Hospital. The majority of the cast from the previous series continue to appear in this series. Bernard Gallagher portrayed emergency medicine consultant Ewart Plimmer. Derek Thompson appeared as charge nurse Charlie Fairhead, whilst Cathy Shipton starred as staff nurse Lisa "Duffy" Duffin. Brenda Fricker played state enrolled nurse Megan Roach. Lisa Bowerman and Robert Pugh portrayed paramedics Sandra Mute and Andrew Ponting. Debbie Roza starred as receptionist Susie Mercier while Christopher Rozycki appeared as porter Kuba Trzcinski. Nigel Anthony and Sonia Woolley also appear as Ted Roach and Ros Plimmer in a recurring capacity.

Helena Little joined the cast in episode one as senior house officer Mary Tomlinson as did Maureen O'Brien who began portraying administrator Elizabeth Straker. Both characters departed at the end of the series. Kate Hardie and Eddie Nestor were cast in the roles of student nurses Karen O'Malley and Cyril James respectively. Cyril was later promoted to staff nurse. Hardie departed the series in episode ten. Bowerman chose to leave the series and her character Sandra was killed off in episode four. Pugh also left the series, with Andrew departing in episode six. They were subsequently replaced within the cast by Ella Wilder and Geoffrey Leesley, who began portraying paramedics Shirley Franklin and Keith Cotterill respectively from episode seven. Roza chose to leave the series, with Susie departing at the end of the series.

=== Main characters ===
- Lisa Bowerman as Sandra Mute (until episode 4)
- Brenda Fricker as Megan Roach
- Bernard Gallagher as Ewart Plimmer
- Kate Hardie as Karen O'Malley (episodes 2−10)
- Geoffrey Leesley as Keith Cotterill (from episode 7)
- Helena Little as Mary Tomlinson (episodes 1−15)
- Eddie Nestor as Cyril James (from episode 2)
- Maureen O'Brien as Elizabeth Straker (episodes 1−15)
- Robert Pugh as Andrew Ponting (until episode 6)
- Debbie Roza as Susie Mercier (until episode 15)
- Christopher Rozycki as Kuba Trzcinski
- Cathy Shipton as Lisa "Duffy" Duffin
- Derek Thompson as Charlie Fairhead
- Ella Wilder as Shirley Franklin (from episode 7)

=== Recurring characters ===
- Nigel Anthony as Ted Roach
- Sonia Woolley as Ros Plimmer

== Episodes ==
No. overall	No. in series	Title	Directed by	Written by	Original release date
16	1	"A Little Lobbying"	Antonia Bird	Jeremy Brock and Paul Unwin	12 September 1987
Temperatures are running high at Holby Hospital, pending an agreement on the future of the night shift. Ewart has two weeks to petition the case for the reopening.
17	2	"A Drop of the Hard Stuff"	Antonia Bird	Roy Mitchell	19 September 1987
A girl is beaten up by her boyfriend and there is a shock for Duffy when the girl is readmitted later. A party thrown by Susie enables Ewart and Elizabeth to make friends.
18	3	"Shades of Love"	Michael Brayshaw	Wally K Daly	26 September 1987
A woman suffering from Alzheimer's disease causes Mary to row with Social Services and Ewart discovers Kuba breaking the rules.
19	4	"Cry for Help"	Alan Wareing	Paul Unwin and Jeremy Brock	3 October 1987
A man is admitted after an electric shock and tragedy strikes when Mute and Ponting are trying to deal with a drunkard.
20	5	"Anaconda"	Michael Brayshaw	Ray Brennan	10 October 1987
The night shift staff have to deal with a performing snake and a brutal racist attack on an Asian man. Ponting, unable to get over the death of Mute decides to leave the ambulance service.
21	6	"Lifelines"	Sharon Miller	Jeremy Brock	17 October 1987
It's Ponting's last night and Duffy's first as acting sister. Meanwhile Charlie encounters hostility when he tries to help a party of cavers.
22	7	"The Raid"	Sharon Miller	Susan Wilkins	24 October 1987
The team are put on full alert when tensions run high between the police and the black community. Duffy reacts badly under pressure.
23	8	"Cross Fingers"	Alan Wareing	David Ashton	31 October 1987
A taxi-driver brings in a seriously ill girl with suspected meningitis. Elizabeth tries to contact Ewart – but why is he not taking her calls?
24	9	"Seeking Heat"	Christopher Menaul	Ray Brennan and Jeremy Brock	7 November 1987
With his maintenance hearing behind him, Ewart can now be open in his relationship with Elizabeth. A massive bomb explosion causes Duffy and Mary to resolve their earlier hostilities.
25	10	"Rock-a-Bye Baby"	Sharon Miller	Ginnie Hole	14 November 1987
An elderly lady put on a waiting list for an operation causes some heart-searching by Charlie, meanwhile Megan suspects child abuse when a woman brings in a badly bruised baby.
26	11	"Hooked"	Michael Brayshaw	Billy Hamon	21 November 1987
Duffy receives some shattering news from Peter and two men turn up at the ED demanding an AIDS test.
27	12	"Fun Night"	Alan Wareing	Al Hunter Ashton	28 November 1987
A row between two youths over a girlfriend results in a stabbing and a revenge attack. Elizabeth's daughter makes a startling announcement.
28	13	"Peace, Brother"	Michael Brayshaw	David Ashton	5 December 1987
Mary's father is rushed into Casualty after collapsing and violence erupts when members of the wandering tribe visit Casualty with an unconscious boy.
29	14	"Burning Cases"	Christopher Menaul	Jeremy Brock and Paul Unwin	12 December 1987
A paraplegic man sets himself on fire and Megan is worried that she might be accused of negligence when an elderly patient falls off a trolley. Ewart is suddenly taken seriously ill with a heart attack.
30	15	"These Things Happen"	Alan Wareing	David Ashton	19 December 1987
The hospital authorities are to hold an investigation over the suspected negligence of an elderly patient. Elizabeth tells Ewart a few home truths about his health.

== Bibliography ==
- Kingsley, Hilary (1995). Casualty: The Inside Story. Penguin Books. ISBN 0-14-024902-8.
