= Casualty series 1 =

First series of Casualty

Casualty
- Series 1
- Starring: Lisa Bowerman; Brenda Fricker; Bernard Gallagher; George Harris; Robert Pugh; Debbie Roza; Christopher Rozycki; Cathy Shipton; Derek Thompson; Julia Watson
- No. of episodes: 15

Release
- Original network: BBC One
- Original release: 6 September – 27 December 1986

Series chronology
- Next → Series 2

The first series of the British medical drama television series Casualty began airing in the United Kingdom on BBC One on 6 September 1986 and finished on 27 December 1986.

== Production ==
The show was created by Jeremy Brock and Paul Unwin. Geraint Morris was appointed as the show's producer. Prior to first series airing, Brock and Unwin visited the Bristol Royal Infirmary where they met a charge nurse called Pete Salt who was appointed the series medical adviser.

The first series of Casualty consisted of fifteen episodes with individual titles, which aired weekly on a Saturday night. The first series featured ten main characters, who were all appointed different roles within the A&E department. By the end of the first series, two actors would not be returning for the second series: Julia Watson (Baz Samuels) and George Harris (Clive King). Watson eventually returned to the programme in 1995 in Series 9 Episode 20.

== Development ==
The idea of Casualty came together when co-creators Jeremy Brock and Paul Unwin were both hospitalised for different reasons. During their time at the hospital, the pair were 'deeply concerned by what they saw'. Brock and Unwin pitched a document and sent it to the BBC in 1985. Unwin said in an interview with Radio Times that their pitch 'read like a manifesto', with the first sentence being: "In 1948, a dream was born – a National Health Service. In 1985, the dream is in tatters." Unwin said that he and Brock were both 'left–wing and passionate', and that they 'knew what stories there were to tell'. After the commissioning of Casualty, the BBC decided to team Unwin and Brock up with television producer Geraint Morris.

One of the reasons Casualty was produced was to help boost decreasing ratings for the BBC between 1984 and 1985 during peak viewing times on Friday and Saturday evenings. Before Brock and Unwin scripted the first series, they took a visit to a hospital based in Bristol. There, they met Pete Salt, a charge nurse. Salt was appointed the series medical adviser, advising the team of Casualty on what was and was not medically possible or accurate.

== Cast ==
=== Overview ===
The first series of Casualty featured ten main characters. All ten characters were introduced in the first episode of the series. The fifteenth episode saw the last appearances of characters Baz Samuels and Clive King, whose respective departures were explained in the second series. The other eight characters reprised their roles in series two.

Throughout the duration of the first series, there were seven notable actors who appeared in guest roles. Graham Cole played a junior doctor in episode one, Michael Garner played PC McMorrow in episode four, Alfred Molina played Fleet Street journalist Harry Horner in episode four, while Vas Blackwood also appeared in episode four, as Bob. Stella Gonet played Clare Wainwright, a specialist registrar in general medicine in episode seven, while Perry Fenwick played patient Marvin Osborne in episode nine.

=== Main characters ===
- Lisa Bowerman as Sandra Mute
- Brenda Fricker as Megan Roach
- Bernard Gallagher as Ewart Plimmer
- George Harris as Clive King
- Robert Pugh as Andrew Ponting
- Debbie Roza as Susie Mercier
- Christopher Rozycki as Kuba Trzcinski
- Cathy Shipton as Lisa "Duffy" Duffin
- Derek Thompson as Charlie Fairhead
- Julia Watson as Barbara "Baz" Samuels

== Episodes ==
No. overall	No. in series	Title	Directed by	Written by	Original release date
1	1	"Gas"	Frank W. Smith	Jeremy Brock and Paul Unwin	6 September 1986
A gas explosion at the docks causes a rush of casualties choking on the fumes, but can an antidote be found in time?
2	2	"Hide and Seek" (Note: See also "Hide and Seek" series 6)	Frank W. Smith	Paul Unwin and Jeremy Brock	13 September 1986
A hysterical woman who threatens to kill a baby tests Baz's patience and ability to the limit.
3	3	"Night Runners"	Antonia Bird	Matthew Bardsley	20 September 1986
A policeman is stabbed at a local football fixture, but is the situation as simple as it seems? A Christian Scientist's beliefs puts her life at a risk.
4	4	"Jump Start"	Antonia Bird	Susan Wilkins	27 September 1986
The night-shift are faced with a motorway pile-up, bleeding Madonna wannabes, and a drunk Fleet Street journalist.
5	5	"Blood Brothers"	Antonia Bird	Wally K. Daly	4 October 1986
A desperate runaway is in need of help, and prejudices are challenged when a gay haemophiliac arrives with a cut hand. Baz's long-term future at Casualty looks doubtful.
6	6	"High Noon"	Frank W. Smith	Ray Brennan	11 October 1986
A law student refuses to accept a diagnosis of Epilepsy, whilst Duffy organises a protest against the planned Casualty service cuts.
7	7	"Professionals"	Frank W. Smith	Susan Wilkins	18 October 1986
A terrified woman is brought in who has been raped and badly beaten. It does not take the staff very long to discover who the culprit is, but confronting him is fraught with difficulties.
8	8	"Crazies"	Renny Rye	Matthew Bardsley	25 October 1986
When Holby's taxi drivers are attacked, Megan worries for the safety of her driver husband. Ewart grows concerned about the safety of his staff.
9	9	"Moonlight Becomes You..."	Renny Rye	Ray Brennan	8 November 1986
When a patient comes into Casualty from an old people's home, a chain of events begins which culminates in a kidnapping.
10	10	"Teeny Poppers"	Renny Rye	Janey Preger	15 November 1986
Trouble is afoot for Ewart when a young Asian youth dies in Casualty and his family threaten the unit with legal action. Megan is brought in for treatment.
11	11	"Drunk"	Jan Sargent	Lise Mayer	22 November 1986
Rumours of a Royal Visit to Casualty cause havoc. Baz and Charlie fight for the life of a half-drowned boy, but their joy at saving him is overshadowed when one of their own is brought in by ambulance.
12	12	"Quiet"	Michael Brayshaw	Roy Mitchell	6 December 1986
Casualty is besieged by all manners of cases, including the victor of a boxing match and an addict who has taken an overdose. A recuperating Megan proves a valuable confidant for Duffy.
13	13	"No Future"	Jan Sargent	Paul Unwin and Jeremy Brock	13 December 1986
A dramatic siege on Megan's estate threatens the life of a child, but the perpetrator is found to be neither terrorist nor madman.
14	14	"Survival"	Michael Brayshaw	Wally K Daly	20 December 1986
The staff is sympathetic when Arthur, who suffers from a heart condition, expresses a desire to end his misery. Baz makes a decision about her pregnancy.
15	15	"Closure"	Jan Sargent	Jeremy Brock and Paul Unwin	27 December 1986
There is little in the way of Christmas cheer, as the department faces the threat of imminent closure. Morale plummets, inspiring Charlie to organise an impromptu pantomime.
