= Al Smith (playwright) =

British writer

Al Smith is a British writer.

Plays for theatre include Harrogate (HighTide Festival / Royal Court Theatre), Diary of a Madman (Traverse Theatre / Gate Theatre), The Astronaut Wives Club (Soho Theatre), Radio (Underbelly / 59E59), Enola (Underbelly) and Rare Earth Mettle (Royal Court).

For television he participated in the 2006 Writers Academy at the BBC and subsequently became part of the regular writing team on Holby City and EastEnders. Between 2008 and 2011 he Co-Created and Co-Exec Produced The Cut, which ran to three series on BBC2.

Plays for BBC Radio include Radio, The Postman of Good Hope, Life in the Freezer, Everyday Time Machines, Dangerous Visions: Culture, Life Lines and All Bleeding Stops Eventually.

Awards include the inaugural BFI/Wellcome Trust Screenwriting Prize for his screenplay "HalfLife" and for his radio series Life Lines he won an Audio Drama Award, a BBC Radio Award and Gold at the 2017 ARIAS.

He is represented by United Agents.
