= Bernard Gallagher =

English actor

- Born: 26 September 1929; Bradford, West Riding of Yorkshire, England
- Died: 27 November 2016 (aged 87); England
- Occupation: Actor
- Spouse: Sylvia Vickers (m. 1971)
- Children: 2

Bernard Gallagher (26 September 1929 – 27 November 2016) was an English actor known for his stage work, including with the National Theatre and the Royal Court; and his many appearances in television soap operas and dramas. He was born in Bradford, West Riding of Yorkshire.

== Biography ==
=== Theatre ===
Gallagher studied English at Sheffield University, and following National service in the RAF Educational Service (1952–54), made his stage debut in Lyme Regis in 1956. Working in regional rep for the next decade, in 1965 he joined London’s Royal Court for Bill Gaskill’s first season, with roles in (amongst others) the original stage productions of Edward Bond’s Saved, and Joe Orton's The Ruffian on the Stair and The Erpingham Camp (both 1967).

Later in 1967, Gallagher began a long association with the National Theatre (1967–1976), when he appeared in Clifford Williams’ all-male As You Like It. Other roles included in Howard Brenton’s Weapons of Happiness and Tom Stoppard’s Jumpers.

He also spent two seasons with the Royal Shakespeare Company, and worked for many other theatre companies, such as Paines Plough and Max Stafford-Clark's Out of Joint. West End appearances included Michael Frayn’s Alphabetical Order (May Fair Theatre, 1975), Willy Russell’s Breezeblock Park (Whitehall Theatre, 1977) and Caryl Churchill’s Heart’s Desire (Duke of York's Theatre, 1997).

=== Television ===
Gallagher played the lead role of compassionate consultant Ewart Plimmer in the first three years of BBC TV's long-running medical drama series Casualty. In Granada Television’s daytime legal drama series Crown Court, he played barrister Jonathan Fry QC.

Gallagher's numerous other TV credits include appearances in two of Britain's most hard-hitting police dramas of the 1970s, The Sweeney and The Professionals. He was cast in The Sweeney as a Desk Sergeant in the episode entitled "Jackpot", whilst in The Professionals Gallagher appeared as a Government Minister in the episode "Need to Know." In 1977, he played the role of Enfield in The Duchess of Duke Street (series 2, episode 12).

Gallagher played recurring character Graham Weston in series 6 and 7 of Heartbeat, and different characters in its sister programme The Royal. He was also an original cast member of Casualty from 1986–1988. Other credits include: Bergerac, Bad Girls, Wycliffe, Cadfael, Midsomer Murders, and London's Burning.

In rare comedic roles he played Mervyn, the Holiday Camp manager in Selwyn, DS Lang in the "Photographs" episode of Some Mothers Do 'Ave 'Em and Mr. Glockenspiel in the "Alternative Culture" episode of The Thin Blue Line.

Gallagher portrayed keen gardener Bill Molesley, father of Joseph Molesley (played by Kevin Doyle), in ITV's Downton Abbey (2010–2013).

=== Death ===
Bernard Gallagher died of pneumonia on 27 November 2016, aged 87.

== Selected acting credits ==
Year	Title	Role	Notes
1979	Casting the Runes	Derek Gayton	TV drama
1983	The Gaffer (TV series) ('Moonlight and Ruses' episode)	Wrigley	series 3
1984	Arthur's Hallowed Ground	George	TV film
1989	Countdown to War	Greenwood	TV film
1997	Photographing Fairies	Doctor at Vicarage	
2004	EastEnders	Judge	TV drama (3 episodes)
2010	The Trip	Bernard	
2010–2013	Downton Abbey	Bill Molesley	TV drama (3 episodes)
