= Casualty (TV series) =

British medical drama series (since 1986)

- Title card introduced in 2018
- Genre: Medical drama
- Created by: Jeremy Brock; Paul Unwin
- Starring: Current and former cast
- Theme music composer: Ken Freeman
- Country of origin: United Kingdom
- Original language: English
- No. of series: 40
- No. of episodes: 1,403 (list of episodes)

Production
- Executive producers: Current: Roxanne Harvey; Previously: Adrian Bate; Laura Mackie; Ruth Caleb; Mal Young; Mervyn Watson; Belinda Campbell; Alison Davis; Johnathan Young; Oliver Kent; Simon Harper; Jon Sen
- Running time: 40–50 minutes 60–90 minutes (special episodes)
- Production companies: BBC Bristol (1986–2011); BBC Cymru Wales (2012–present); BBC Studios Continuing Drama Productions

Original release
- Network: BBC One; BBC iPlayer
- Release: 6 September 1986 – present

Related
- Holby City; HolbyBlue; Casualty 1900s; Casualty@Holby City

Casualty (stylised as CASUAL+Y since 1997) is a British medical drama series broadcast on BBC One. Created by Jeremy Brock and Paul Unwin and initially produced by Geraint Morris, it first aired in the United Kingdom on 6 September 1986. Casualty is recognised as the longest-running primetime medical drama series in the world. The show has since become a significant part of British culture synonymous with its accurate depiction of the NHS.

Initially, Casualty aired during the autumn for its first six series, before increasing to 24 episodes annually by 1992. In the late 1990s and early 2000s, the episode count expanded further, and by 2004, the series was running 48 episodes a year, with breaks around Christmas and major televised events. From 2023, Casualty introduced a regular autumn break due to rising production costs, settling on an average of 36 episodes per year.

The show is set in the fictional Holby City Hospital, focusing on the staff and patients in the Emergency department. It shared a close connection with its former sister programme, Holby City, a spin-off that aired from 1999 until its cancellation in 2022. HolbyBlue, a police drama set in the same universe, also spun off from Casualty and aired between 2007 and 2008. In 2027, the show is expected to move to a new fictional hospital based in Wales to reflect the Welsh NHS, with various Welsh characters set to be introduced. It will also align with where Casualty has been filmed in Roath Lock, Cardiff, since 2011.

== Creation ==
In 1984, the controller of BBC1 Michael Grade returned from Hollywood to reinvigorate a faltering Saturday night schedule which was falling behind that of ITV. Head of drama Jonathan Powell was instructed to create a long running drama series to take over from Juliet Bravo for an 8pm Saturday night slot.

From there, newcomers to television writing, script editor Jeremy Brock and theatre director Paul Unwin came up with the idea for a medical drama after both had spent time hospitalised and were 'deeply concerned by what they saw'.

To research the show, they visited the A&E department at Bristol Royal Infirmary where they met charge nurse Peter Salt. Brock and Unwin were shown around and witnessed a typical shift in the department dealing with a myriad of cases. Salt was then appointed the series medical advisor and became the template for the character Charlie Fairhead. Brock and Unwin then pitched their idea to the BBC in 1985 as a manifesto with the title 'In 1948, a dream was born. In 1985, that dream is in tatters.' Prior to being titled Casualty, the series was developed under the working titles Frontline and subsequently City Hospital.

According to writer Susan Wilkins, the show was conceived as a response to the political climate of the Margaret Thatcher era. Unwin, reflecting on its origins, stated that as young socialists, they aimed to create a "television revolution" that would be feminist, anti-racist, pro-NHS, and anti-Conservative.

The first series of Casualty was met with controversy and discussed in the House of Commons for its negative portrayal of the NHS and depicting staff drinking on duty due to the pressures of working in A&E. Despite this, many people leapt to the defence of the series for its accuracy, including nurses at a Royal College of Nursing conference where Brock and Unwin appeared in order to discuss the series.

== Production ==
=== Setting ===
Casualty and Holby City are both set in the fictional Holby City Hospital, located in the fictional county of Wyvern in the southwest of England. From the show's inception until Series 26, episode 16, exterior shots of the city were filmed in Bristol, featuring iconic landmarks such as the floating harbour and Clifton Suspension Bridge.

On 20 May 2025, the BBC released a tender notice, inviting production companies to bid for the opportunity to produce the next three series of Casualty. It was confirmed on 17 December 2025 that the contract had been awarded to BBC Studios, who will continue to produce the next three series. It was then confirmed that the setting will move to a new fictional hospital based in Wales to reflect the Welsh NHS, as well as to align the setting with the production location. The changes are expected to take place in 2027.

=== Locations ===
The interior A&E set for the first series was at BBC Television Centre in London, where the set had to be "struck" once filming had finished each night. By Series 2, a permanent interior set was built in a warehouse on Kingsland trading estate in the St. Philip's area of Bristol, close to where the exterior shots of the A&E and hospital were filmed. The set remained at the warehouse for 24 years, until production moved to Cardiff during Series 26 in 2011.

Allen House, part of the Ashley Down Centre campus at City of Bristol College, served as the location for most exterior shots of the hospital's A&E entrance from 1986 until 2002. In 2002, a new exterior set was constructed at Lawrence Hill Industrial Park, Bristol.

The two part episode "Next of Kin", which depicted a fire destroying the hospital department, was the last episode filmed in Bristol, and the first episode filmed in Cardiff "Duty of Care" aired on 7 January 2012 as an 80-minute special.

Since 2011, Casualty has been produced at Roath Lock Studios in Cardiff with a permanent base housing interior and exterior sets, as well as production offices. Additionally, railway scenes are filmed at various preserved railways, including the West Somerset Railway, Avon Valley Railway, and Barry Tourist Railway. For the premiere of series 33, filming took place in Bristol and Yate in May 2018.

There have been multiple episodes of Casualty taking place partially or entirely abroad, filmed in the following countries:

- Series 14 Episodes 29 and 30 – Australia.
- Series 18 Episode 16 – Sweden as Lapland.
- Series 21 Episodes 1 and 2 – Cambodia.
- Series 29 Episode 32 – Romania.

Although Series 32 Episodes 1 and 2 are set in Northern France, filming for these episodes took place in Cardiff and Fishguard.

=== Broadcast ===
Casualty has predominantly been broadcast on Saturday nights since its inception, although it briefly aired on Fridays from 1988 to 1991. The first two series featured 15 episodes each, while Series 3 had 10 episodes—one of which was postponed following the death of guest star Roy Kinnear. Series 4, 5, and 6 consisted of 12, 13, and 15 episodes, respectively. The Series 6 finale episode, which centered around a plane crash, was postponed due to its proximity to the anniversary of the Lockerbie disaster.

In September 1992, Casualty returned to Saturday nights with a series length extended to 24 episodes per year and aired in a pre-watershed slot around 8 pm. The move sparked controversy due to the graphic and controversial storylines, in particular the Series 7 finale "Boiling Point" which aired at the later time of 9:30 pm instead of 7:50 pm.

In 1997, the episode count increased to 26 for Series 12, including two 75-minute specials. Subsequent series saw further increases: 28 episodes for Series 13, 30 for Series 14, 36 for Series 15, 40 for Series 16 and 17, and 46 for Series 18. By 2004, Casualty had transitioned to an almost year-round format, with 48 episodes per series from Series 19 through 25. This number dropped to 42 for Series 26, attributed to the show's production move from Bristol to Cardiff. Series 27 saw an increase to 44 episodes, with Series 28 returning to 48 episodes. From August 2014, episode counts vary, with Series 29 having 46 episodes and 43 episodes for Series 30. Whilst Series 31 and Series 32 returned to 44 episodes.

The 1,000th episode aired on 25 June 2016, followed by a feature-length 30th anniversary episode on 27 August 2016 as the Series 31 premiere. For the Series 31 finale, co-creator Paul Unwin wrote a special episode filmed entirely in one take using a single camera, five boom operators, and 40 microphones.

The episode count increased to 46 for Series 33 before dropping down to 43 episodes for Series 34. Production was temporarily halted during Series 34 on 17 March 2020 due to the COVID-19 pandemic, with filming resuming in September 2020. When the show returned as Series 35 in January 2021, the episode count reduced to 30 and shortened to 40 minutes instead of the usual 50. Series 36 saw a return to 44 episodes, with a reduction to 43 episodes in Series 37 and 36 episodes in Series 38.

In 2023, due to a significant rise in production costs, it was confirmed that future series of Casualty would comprise 36 episodes. A spokesperson from the BBC said: "Our priority is always delivering quality over hours and due to super inflation in drama production we've taken the decision to slightly reduce the number of episodes per year in order to maintain the quality on screen for audiences. We've received no complaints from cast and crew, and it will be back on air later this year." From 2027, the programme will consist of a minimum of 24 episodes per series for at least three series.

Casualty typically airs for 50 minutes between 20:00–22:00 on BBC One, with the schedule sometimes shifting due to special events like the Eurovision Song Contest or sporting events. Unusually, episode 31 of Series 38 aired on BBC Two due to a Euro 2024 group stage match. Occasionally, if an episode is split into two parts, part one airs on the Saturday and part two on the Sunday, as seen with the first 2 episodes of Series 13 and Series 14 among others.

In December 2023, it was confirmed that episodes would release on BBC iPlayer prior to transmission on BBC One, with episodes releasing every Saturday at 6am.

The U&Drama channel shows repeat episodes of Classic Casualty and started from the first episode in May 2023. Former series and episodes are also available on demand after broadcast.

=== Training schemes ===
In February 2024, BBC Studios launched two new training schemes for aspiring writers and directors—The Casualty Directors' Scheme and The Writers' Studio: Casualty—based within the Casualty production team. These initiatives will give eight successful candidates the opportunity to direct or write an episode of the long-running drama. Executive producer Roxanne Harvey expressed enthusiasm for the launch, highlighting the importance of these training programmes to "sustain the high quality of our iconic drama."

== Cast and characters ==
Casualty follows the professional and personal lives of the medical and ancillary staff at Holby City Hospital's emergency department. The show features an ensemble cast, which originally included 10 main characters in Series 1. These characters were consultant Ewart Plimmer (Bernard Gallagher), senior house officer Baz Samuels (Julia Watson), charge nurse Charlie Fairhead (Derek Thompson), staff nurse Clive King (George Harris), state enrolled nurse Megan Roach (Brenda Fricker), student nurse Lisa "Duffy" Duffin (Cathy Shipton), paramedics Sandra Mute and Andrew Ponting (Lisa Bowerman and Robert Pugh), receptionist Susie Mercier (Debbie Roza) and porter Kuba Trzcinski (Christopher Rozycki).

The current regular cast includes clinical lead and senior consultant in emergency medicine Flynn Byron (Olly Rix); clinical nurse manager & senior sister Siobhan McKenzie (Melanie Hill); senior consultant in emergency medicine Dylan Keogh (William Beck); consultants in emergency medicine Stevie Nash (Elinor Lawless) and Rash Masum (Neet Mohan); speciality registrar in emergency medicine Nicole Piper (Sammy T. Dobson); F2 resident doctor Matty Linlaker (Aron Julius); advanced clinical practitioner Faith Dean (Kirsty Mitchell); senior staff nurse Rida Amaan (Sarah Seggari), staff nurse and staff midwife Jodie Whyte (Anna Chell), staff nurse Cameron Mickelthwaite (Barney Walsh); operational duty manager and senior paramedic Jan Jenning (Di Botcher); specialist paramedic in critical care and lead paramedic Iain Dean (Michael Stevenson); paramedics, Theodore "Teddy" Gowan (Milo Clarke), Jacob Masters (Charles Venn) and Indie Jankowski (Naomi Wakszlak) also feature prominently.

A survey by Radio Times in March 2004 found that Casualty has launched the careers of more future stars than any other UK soap or drama series. Actors such as Kate Winslet, Orlando Bloom, Jodie Comer, Minnie Driver, Alfred Molina, Christopher Eccleston, Tom Hiddleston, Ashley Artus, Parminder Nagra, Caryn Edwards, Sadie Frost, Ray Winstone, David Walliams, Jonny Lee Miller, Martin Freeman, Helen Baxendale, Robson Green, and Brenda Fricker made appearances before achieving wider success. Winslet, reflecting on her 1993 appearance, stated that appearing on Casualty was almost a rite of passage for British actors and taught her valuable lessons in acting naturally in front of the camera. The series has also included guest roles by more established stars such as Marina Sirtis, Norman Wisdom, Amanda Redman, Anita Dobson, Jenny Seagrove, Rula Lenska, Prunella Scales, Celia Imrie, Toyah Willcox, Maureen Lipman, Frances Barber, Andrew Sachs, Russ Abbot and Stephanie Beacham.

As part of the 2027 changes, whilst new Welsh characters will be introduced, it is expected that many characters will remain with the programme.

== Home releases ==
The first three series of Casualty were released on DVD (Region 2, UK) by 2 Entertain/Cinema Club, with the third series being released to coincide with the show's 20th anniversary celebrations. In Australia, the first series was made available by Umbrella Entertainment. Currently, there are no plans for future DVD releases in either the UK or Australia.

DVD title	No. of discs	Year(s)	No. of episodes	DVD release		
DVD title	No. of discs	Year(s)	No. of episodes	Region 2	Region 4	Notes
Casualty Series 1	4	1986	15	10 April 2006	8 December 2008	
Casualty Series 2	4	1987	15	10 July 2006	—N/a	
Casualty Series 3	3	1988	10	11 September 2006	—N/a	

== International broadcast ==
Irish viewers can stream Casualty on the free RTÉ Player service. In the United States, the series is available on Britbox, a subscription-based streaming service that specializes in British television content.

In New Zealand, the current series of Casualty is available to watch on Sky New Zealand channel 207 BBC First and on demand via Sky Go.

== Adaptations and related media ==
=== Holby City ===
Holby City premiered on 12 January 1999 as a spin-off from Casualty and is set in the same fictional Holby City Hospital. The series focuses on the lives and careers of the medical staff and patients on the hospital's surgical wards, addressing various clinical and ethical dilemmas. Like Casualty, the show features an ensemble cast of regular characters, including surgeons, nurses, and ancillary staff, while guest actors play the patients. Over the years, notable guest stars have included Eric Sykes, Phill Jupitus, Michael Jayston, Michele Dotrice, Ronni Ancona, Emma Samms, Lee Ryan, Nikki Sanderson, and Johnny Briggs.

The series was created by Mal Young and Tony McHale, with McHale later becoming the executive producer from 2007 to 2010. He was succeeded by Casualty's executive producer, Belinda Campbell.

=== Casualty@Holby City ===
Reflecting Holby City's origins as a spin-off from Casualty and the interconnected premises of the two series, the BBC has occasionally aired crossover mini-dramas titled Casualty@Holby City, featuring characters from both shows. Mervyn Watson, former executive producer of Casualty, explained that the idea for the crossovers stemmed from a casual suggestion made within the BBC's comedy department. The concept was embraced by the Controller of Drama, who then commissioned the crossovers with input from both shows' executive producers.

Filming for Casualty@Holby City episodes is typically split between Casualty's Bristol set and Holby City's Elstree studios. Notably, a significant portion of the Christmas 2005 crossover was filmed on location in a road tunnel in Caernarfon, Wales. The theme tune for the crossover episodes combines shortened versions of the Casualty and Holby City themes, a choice criticized by The Daily Mirror as "basically both theme tunes played at once."

Before the broadcast of the 2005 Christmas crossover, Watson commented on the future of the crossover episodes, stating that while they couldn't guarantee more, they would be willing to continue them as long as there was audience interest. In 2007, Holby City producer Diana Kyle noted the logistical challenges of producing crossovers, given the demanding year-round filming schedules for both series. Despite this, the production teams remained enthusiastic about creating further crossovers, with Casualty producer Oliver Kent reiterating in 2010 that logistical challenges, rather than a lack of interest, were the primary obstacle to producing these special episodes.

=== HolbyBlue ===
In April 2006, the BBC announced the production of a new spin-off drama from Casualty, titled HolbyBlue. The series centered on the police service in Holby South and aired on BBC One, with its first series occupying a Tuesday night slot, while Holby City returned to its previous Thursday 8:00 pm timeslot. The crossover between the two shows was significant, with long-running Casualty character Charlie Fairhead appearing in the first episode of HolbyBlue, and a full two-part crossover episode with Holby City airing at the start of the show's second series. However, on 6 August 2008, the BBC confirmed that HolbyBlue had been cancelled after two series.

=== Casualty 1900s ===
In December 2006, the BBC aired Casualty 1906, a historical medical drama reflecting life in the 'Receiving Room' of the Royal London Hospital 100 years prior, before the development of modern A&E departments. Based on historical hospital records and news reports, the drama depicted the medical practices and societal conditions of the time. Following its success, a three-episode miniseries titled Casualty 1907 was broadcast in 2008. While not a direct spin-off nor set in the same fictional location as Casualty, The Times suggested that the BBC leveraged the popularity of Casualty to introduce the historical drama, a sentiment echoed by The Guardian. A third series, Casualty 1908, featuring Cherie Lunghi, was also commissioned. On 25 March 2009, it was announced that the BBC would produce Casualty 1909, a six-part series that aired in June and July 2009.

== Awards and nominations ==
Since its inception in 1986, Casualty has been nominated for a total of over 100 awards, and has won over 40 of these nominations. They have won various British Academy Television Awards, including numerous accolades for the Best Soap and Continuing Drama. They are nominated annually at the Inside Soap Awards, with various cast members winning acting accolades, including Cathy Shipton, Chelsea Halfpenny and Nigel Harman. In 2017, Casualty won its first National Television Award, in the Drama category. They also won the Special Award at the 2016 TRIC Awards.

Casualty has won numerous RTS Awards; in 1992, they won for Best Drama Series, having gone on to win the award a further five times as of 2025. In 2011, they won for Best Continuing Drama at the Writers' Guild of Great Britain Awards. They have also been awarded by the Albert Sustainable Production Certification for having eco-friendly production practices, as well as receiving acclaim for their portrayal of LGBTQ+ characters, winning at the Stonewall Awards in 2011.

== See also ==
- ER – Television drama based on a fictional US hospital's emergency department
- Chicago Med – Drama based on a fictional US hospital's emergency department
- The Bill – British police drama
- London's Burning (TV series) – British fire and rescue drama
