= List of Casualty episodes (series 21–34) =

The following is a list of the episodes of the British television series Casualty from series 21 to series 34. Casualty premiered on 6 September 1986 and was originally commissioned for fifteen episodes. The first series concluded on 27 December 1986, and following its success, a second series was commissioned. Casualty has continued running since.

== Series overview ==
Series	Episodes	Originally released	
Series	Episodes	First released	Last released
1	15	6 September 1986	27 December 1986
2	15	12 September 1987	19 December 1987
3	10	9 September 1988	11 November 1988
4	12	8 September 1989	1 December 1989
5	13	7 September 1990	7 December 1990
6	15	6 September 1991	27 February 1992
7	24	12 September 1992	27 February 1993
8	24	18 September 1993	26 February 1994
9	24	17 September 1994	25 March 1995
10	24	16 September 1995	24 February 1996
11	24	14 September 1996	22 February 1997
12	26	11 September 1997 (Note: The opening episode was originally billed for 6 September 1997, but was deferred due to the funeral of Diana, Princess of Wales. BBC1 showed the film Free Willy in its place.)	28 February 1998
13	28	5 September 1998	13 March 1999
14	30	18 September 1999	25 March 2000
15	36	16 September 2000	28 April 2001
16	40	15 September 2001	29 June 2002
17	40	14 September 2002	21 June 2003
18	46	13 September 2003	28 August 2004
19	48	11 September 2004	20 August 2005
20	48	10 September 2005	26 August 2006
21	48	23 September 2006	4 August 2007
22	48	8 September 2007	9 August 2008
23	48	13 September 2008	1 August 2009
24	48	12 September 2009	21 August 2010
25	47	4 September 2010	6 August 2011
26	42	13 August 2011	22 July 2012
27	44	18 August 2012	26 July 2013
28	48	3 August 2013	23 August 2014
29	46	30 August 2014	23 August 2015
30	43	29 August 2015	30 July 2016
31	45	27 August 2016	29 July 2017
32	44	19 August 2017	4 August 2018
33	46	11 August 2018	10 August 2019
34	43	17 August 2019	26 September 2020
35	30	2 January 2021	7 August 2021
36	44	14 August 2021	13 August 2022
37	43	20 August 2022	19 August 2023
38	36	26 August 2023	3 August 2024
39	34	10 August 2024	12 July 2025
40	20	2 August 2025	18 April 2026
41	TBA	25 April 2026	TBA

== Episodes ==
=== Series 21 (2006–2007) ===
No. overall	No. in series	Title	Directed by	Written by	Original release date	UK viewers (millions)
543	1	"Different Worlds – Part One"	Patrick Lau	Ann Marie Di Mambro	23 September 2006	6.54
544	2	"Different Worlds – Part Two"	Patrick Lau	Ann Marie Di Mambro	24 September 2006	6.70
545	3	"Waste of Space"	Shani S. Grewal	Robin Mukherjee	30 September 2006	5.81
546	4	"Heads Together"	Rhys Powys	Joy Wilkinson	1 October 2006	6.57
547	5	"Sons and Lovers"	Emma Bodger	Matthew Evans	14 October 2006	7.45
548	6	"Angels and Demons"	Chris Lovett	Stephen McAteer	21 October 2006	6.54
549	7	"What You See Is What You Get"	Sharon Miller	Rachel Flowerday	28 October 2006	7.33
550	8	"Born to be Wild"	Darcia Martin	Peter Mills	4 November 2006	6.52
551	9	"To Be a Parent"	Jill Robertson	Nazrin Choudhury	11 November 2006	6.82
552	10	"It's Now or Never"	Ben Morris	Gregory Evans	18 November 2006	7.17
553	11	"All Through the Night"	Ian Barnes	Gary Parker	25 November 2006	6.61
554	12	"No Place Like..."	Emma Bodger	Jo O'Keefe and Ann Marie Di Mambro	2 December 2006	7.11
555	13	"The Edge of Fear"	Shani S. Grewal	Chris Boiling	9 December 2006	7.16
556	14	"In Good Faith"	Brett Fallis	Ming Ho	16 December 2006	7.83
557	15	"Killing Me Softly"	Diarmuid Lawrence	Barbara Machin	23 December 2006	7.85
558	16	"Silent Night" (Note: See also "Silent Night" series 7)	Diarmuid Lawrence	Barbara Machin	24 December 2006	7.87
559	17	"The Sunny Side of the Street – Part One"	Rob MacGillivray	Gaby Chiappe	30 December 2006	8.29
560	18	"The Sunny Side of the Street – Part Two"	Rob MacGillivray	Gaby Chiappe	31 December 2006	5.83
561	19	"Fish Out of Water"	Henry Foster	Tom Lisle	6 January 2007	7.77
562	20	"Stormy Weather"	Ken Grieve	Sian Evans	13 January 2007	7.22
563	21	"The Personal Touch"	Jill Robertson	Ann Marie Di Mambro	20 January 2007	7.85
564	22	"Countdown"	Illy	Peter Mills	27 January 2007	7.54
565	23	"The Silence of Friends"	Rupert Such	Jason Sutton	3 February 2007	6.62
566	24	"No Return"	Nic Phillips	Andrew Clifford	10 February 2007	8.22
567	25	"The Miracle on Harry's Last Shift"	Brett Fallis	Mark Catley	17 February 2007	6.96
568	26	"The Killing Floor"	Craig Lines	Ann Marie Di Mambro	24 February 2007	7.32
569	27	"Combat Indicators – Part One"	Ian Barnes	Stephen McAteer	3 March 2007	7.01
570	28	"Combat Indicators – Part Two"	Rob MacGillivray	Stephen McAteer	7 March 2007	4.85
571	29	"Sweet Charity"	Jill Robertson	Richard Curtis & Gary Parker	10 March 2007	7.00
572	30	"A World Elsewhere"	Dez McCarthy	Sasha Hails	17 March 2007	6.01
573	31	"Stitch"	Shani S. Grewal	Gregory Evans	18 March 2007	5.66
574	32	"Life's too Short"	Craig Lines	Linda Thompson	24 March 2007	6.83
575	33	"Day One"	Frank W. Smith	Robin Mukherjee	31 March 2007	6.69
576	34	"Lost in the Rough"	Paul Murphy	Kevin Clarke & Linda Thompson	7 April 2007	6.35
577	35	"Lush"	Nic Phillips	Ray Brooking	21 April 2007	6.57
578	36	"Aliens"	Nigel Douglas	Tom Lisle & Jack Kelsey	28 April 2007	7.14
579	37	"Close Encounters"	Ben Morris	Sian Evans & Robin Mukherjee	5 May 2007	6.59
580	38	"A Long Way from Home"	Joss Agnew	Ann Marie Di Mambro	19 May 2007	6.42
581	39	"The Apostate"	Rupert Such	Jason Sutton	26 May 2007	6.77
582	40	"Communion"	Simon Massey	Neil Docking	2 June 2007	6.26
583	41	"Brass in Pocket"	Derek Lister	Gaby Chiappe	9 June 2007	6.32
584	42	"Entropy"	Craig Lines	Sasha Hails	16 June 2007	5.13
585	43	"It Never Rains..."	Paul Murphy	Chris Boiling & Jason Sutton	23 June 2007	5.94
586	44	"Lie to Me"	Nigel Douglas	Stephen McAteer	30 June 2007	6.98
587	45	"The Fires Within"	Paul Norton Walker	Gary Parker and Jack Kelsey	14 July 2007	5.73
588	46	"Walking the Line"	David Innes Edwards	Linda Thompson and Jason Sutton	21 July 2007	6.52
589	47	"Seize the Day"	Jim Loach	Tom Lisle	28 July 2007	6.04
590	48	"To Love You So"	Robert Knights	Gaby Chiappe	4 August 2007	6.03

=== Series 22 (2007–2008) ===
No. overall	No. in series	Title	Directed by	Written by	Original release date	UK viewers (millions)
591	1	"My First Day"	Andy Hay	Mark Catley	8 September 2007	6.08
592	2	"Charlie's Anniversary"	Andy Hay	Mark Catley	9 September 2007	7.04
593	3	"Meltdown"	Richard Signy	Sasha Hails	15 September 2007	5.78
594	4	"No End of Blame"	A J Quinn	Patrick Wilde	22 September 2007	6.78
595	5	"Sliding Doors"	Farren Blackburn	Rachel Flowerday	29 September 2007	6.37
596	6	"Core Values"	Robert Del Maestro	Al Smith	6 October 2007	6.93
597	7	"Inappropriate Behaviour"	Ian Barnes	Michael Jenner	13 October 2007	5.75
598	8	"My Aim Is True"	Jill Robertson	Jason Sutton	20 October 2007	5.17
599	9	"As One Door Closes..."	Julie Edwards	Stephen McAteer	27 October 2007	6.91
600	10	"Finding the Words"	Alan Macmillan	Katharine Way & Mark Catley	3 November 2007	6.82
601	11	"A House Divided"	Christopher King	Daisy Coulam	10 November 2007	7.07
602	12	"Strangers When We Met"	David Bartlett	Jason Sutton	17 November 2007	6.66
603	13	"How Soon Is Now?"	Ian Barnes	Ian Kershaw	24 November 2007	6.33
604	14	"Inheritance"	Ian Barnes	Rachel Flowerday	1 December 2007	6.92
605	15	"Behind Closed Doors"	Lance Kneeshaw	Mark Catley	8 December 2007	6.95
606	16	"Snowball"	Lance Kneeshaw	Suzie Smith	15 December 2007	6.76
607	17	"(What's so funny 'bout) Peace Love and Understanding"	David O'Neill	Gert Thomas	22 December 2007	8.18
608	18	"Take a Cup of Kindness"	Paul Murphy	Sasha Hails	29 December 2007	7.14
609	19	"For Auld Lang Syne" (Note: See also "For Auld Lang Syne" series 28)	Paul Murphy	Sasha Hails	30 December 2007	6.97
610	20	"Broken Homes"	Diana Patrick	Steve Keyworth	5 January 2008	7.76
611	21	"Adrenaline Rush"	Diana Patrick	Stephen McAteer	12 January 2008	7.83
612	22	"Take it Back"	Nic Phillips	Rachel Flowerday	19 January 2008	8.15
613	23	"Where's the Art in Heartache"	Nic Phillips	Jason Sutton	26 January 2008	7.69
614	24	"Before a Fall"	Ian Barnes	Dana Fainaru	2 February 2008	8.47
615	25	"Sex and Death"	Ian Barnes	Mark Catley	9 February 2008	8.31
616	26	"Say Say My Playmate"	Julie Edwards	Abi Bown	16 February 2008	7.71
617	27	"Silent All These Years"	Julie Edwards	Laura Watson	1 March 2008	7.63
618	28	"Thicker than Water" "To Serve and Protect"	Robert Knights	Jason Sutton	8 March 2008	7.09
619	29	"Diamond Dogs"	Robert Knights	David Bowker	15 March 2008	7.97
620	30	"Face the World"	David Innes Edwards	Jeff Young	22 March 2008	7.14
621	31	"To Thine Own Self Be True"	Robert Bierman	Patrick Wilde	29 March 2008	7.23
622	32	"Bricks and Daughters"	Robert Bierman	Paul Jenkins	5 April 2008	7.52
623	33	"Someone's Lucky Night"	Jon Sen	Mark Cairns	12 April 2008	6.76
624	34	"Walk the Line"	Jon Sen	Rachel Flowerday	19 April 2008	6.42
625	35	"The Great Pretenders"	Piotr Szkopiak	Jack Kelsey	26 April 2008	6.56
626	36	"Love Is..."	Piotr Szkopiak	Sasha Hails	3 May 2008	6.17
627	37	"Saturday Night Fever"	Christopher King	Mark Catley	10 May 2008	5.79
628	38	"When Love Came to Town"	Christopher King	Jeff Povey	17 May 2008	6.83
629	39	"Opposing Forces"	Edward Bennett	Jason Sutton	31 May 2008	4.15
630	40	"Have a Go, Hero"	Edward Bennett	Martha Hillier	7 June 2008	5.89
631	41	"Is She Really Going Out With Him?"	Ian Barnes	Martin Jameson	14 June 2008	6.19
632	42	"They May Not Mean to, But They Do"	Ian Barnes	Paul Logue	28 June 2008	5.88
633	43	"I Can Hear the Grass Grow"	Peter Nicholson	Ian Kershaw	5 July 2008	5.88
634	44	"Salt and Sugar"	Peter Nicholson	Jason Sutton	12 July 2008	5.69
635	45	"Paradise Lost"	Simon Massey	Ellen Taylor	19 July 2008	6.04
636	46	"The Things We Do For..."	Simon Massey	Dana Fainaru	26 July 2008	5.31
637	47	"This Mess We're In – Part One"	Julie Edwards	Daisy Coulam	2 August 2008	5.96
638	48	"This Mess We're In – Part Two"	Julie Edwards	Sasha Hails	9 August 2008	6.63

=== Series 23 (2008–2009) ===
No. overall	No. in series	Title	Directed by	Written by	Original release date	UK viewers (millions)
639	1	"Farmead Menace – Part One"	Keith Boak	Mark Catley	13 September 2008	5.74
640	2	"Farmead Menace – Part Two"	Keith Boak	Mark Catley	14 September 2008	5.94
641	3	"Interventions"	Jim Loach	Paul Logue	20 September 2008	6.07
642	4	"Guilt Complex"	Jim Loach	Paul Logue & Paul Campbell	27 September 2008	5.83
643	5	"Face Up" (Note: See also "Facing Up" series 6, "Facing Up" series 12 & "Facing Up" series 19)	Ian Barnes	Suzie Smith	4 October 2008	6.46
644	6	"Hurt"	Jon Sen	Jeff Povey	11 October 2008	5.59
645	7	"There and Back Again"	Jon Sen	Jason Sutton	18 October 2008	6.14
646	8	"The Evil That Men Do"	Paul Murphy	David Bowker	25 October 2008	5.72
647	9	"The Line of Fire"	Paul Murphy	Michael Levine	1 November 2008	6.30
648	10	"Impact"	Angus Jackson	Mark Cairns	8 November 2008	5.76
649	11	"Own Personal Jesus"	Angus Jackson	Dana Fainaru	15 November 2008	5.87
650	12	"Reality Bites"	Will Sinclair	Martin Jameson	22 November 2008	5.33
651	13	"A Slip In Time"	Suri Krishnamma	Sasha Hails	29 November 2008	5.15
652	14	"Happiness"	Suri Krishnamma	Daisy Coulam	6 December 2008	5.96
653	15	"Doing the Right Thing"	Will Sinclair	Abi Bown	13 December 2008	5.43
654	16	"This Will Be Our Year"	Roberto Bangura	Paul Logue	20 December 2008	8.15
655	17	"Took a Long Time to Come"	Roberto Bangura	Paul Logue	21 December 2008	6.53
656	18	"My Last Day – Part One"	Paul Murphy	Mark Catley	27 December 2008	6.38
657	19	"My Last Day – Part Two"	Paul Murphy	Mark Catley	3 January 2009	6.41
658	20	"Crush"	David O'Neill	Jeff Povey	10 January 2009	7.14
659	21	"No Going Back"	David O'Neill	Abby Ajayi	17 January 2009	7.00
660	22	"The Price of Life"	Rob Evans	Daisy Coulam	24 January 2009	7.18
661	23	"Midday Sun"	Rob Evans	Karen Laws	31 January 2009	7.33
662	24	"Watershed"	Fraser MacDonald	Dana Fainaru	7 February 2009	7.36
663	25	"Stand by Me"	Fraser MacDonald	Suzie Smith	14 February 2009	6.22
664	26	"Blood"	Angus Jackson	Justin Young	21 February 2009	6.37
665	27	"Could We Be Heroes"	Angus Jackson	Jeff Povey	28 February 2009	6.84
666	28	"Before a Fall"	Will Sinclair	Martin Jameson	7 March 2009	7.05
667	29	"Shields"	Will Sinclair	Philip Gawthorne & Daisy Coulam	14 March 2009	6.60
668	30	"Lie Low"	Jon Sen	Dana Fainaru	21 March 2009	6.67
669	31	"All You Need Is Love"	Roberto Bangura	Ellen Taylor & Mark Catley	28 March 2009	7.00
670	32	"True Lies"	Roberto Bangura	Sally Tatchell	4 April 2009	7.08
671	33	"Someone to Watch Over Me"	Paul Murphy	Sasha Hails	11 April 2009	6.51
672	34	"The Trap"	Paul Murphy	Lena Rae & Mark Catley	18 April 2009	6.14
673	35	"Better Drowned"	Ian Barnes	Paul Logue	25 April 2009	5.82
674	36	"The Price We Pay"	Ian Barnes	Daisy Coulam	2 May 2009	5.90
675	37	"Hostile Takeover"	Alice Troughton	Mark Cairns	9 May 2009	6.00
676	38	"With This Ring"	Alice Troughton	Martin Jameson & Alice Nutter	23 May 2009	4.65
677	39	"Who Do You Think You Are?"	Alan Grint	Jeff Povey	30 May 2009	5.11
678	40	"Palimpsest"	Alan Grint	Jason Sutton	6 June 2009	5.91
679	41	"Fight or Flight"	Adrian Vitoria	Fiona Evans	13 June 2009	5.28
680	42	"Parent Trap"	Adrian Vitoria	Suzie Smith	20 June 2009	5.90
681	43	"Not Over Til the Fat Lady Sings"	Dermot Boyd	Sasha Hails	27 June 2009	6.06
682	44	"Ask Me No Questions"	Dermot Boyd	Justin Young	4 July 2009	5.84
683	45	"Ashes"	Simon Massey	Martin Jameson	11 July 2009	6.32
684	46	"Great Expectations"	Simon Massey	Michael Levine	18 July 2009	5.75
685	47	"No Fjords in Finland – Part One"	Will Sinclair	Paul Logue	25 July 2009	5.72
686	48	"No Fjords in Finland – Part Two"	Will Sinclair	Paul Logue	1 August 2009	5.77

=== Series 24 (2009–2010) ===
No. overall	No. in series	Title	Directed by	Written by	Original release date	UK viewers (millions)
687	1	"Dawn of the ED – Part One"	Paul Murphy	Daisy Coulam	12 September 2009	5.75
688	2	"Dawn of the ED – Part Two"	Paul Murphy	Daisy Coulam	13 September 2009	5.94
689	3	"And Then There Were Three"	Ian Barnes	Mark Catley	19 September 2009	5.91
690	4	"Sunset Syndrome"	Ian Barnes	Dana Fainaru	26 September 2009	6.06
691	5	"Not Forgotten"	Alan Grint	Tom Bidwell	3 October 2009	6.37
692	6	"Comfort Zone"	Alan Grint	Karen Laws	10 October 2009	5.52
693	7	"Love is a Sacrifice"	Dermot Boyd	Rachel Flowerday	18 October 2009	5.04
694	8	"Not Wisely But Too Well"	Dermot Boyd	Jason Sutton & Daisy Coulam	24 October 2009	5.46
695	9	"Regrets"	Adrian Vitoria	Suzie Smith & Ellen Taylor	31 October 2009	5.63
696	10	"Every Breath You Take"	Jon Sen	Sally Tatchell	7 November 2009	5.40
697	11	"Leave Me Standing"	Jon Sen	Abi Bown	14 November 2009	5.51
698	12	"Second Chance"	Declan O'Dwyer	Paul Mari	21 November 2009	5.69
699	13	"The Devil You Know"	Declan O'Dwyer	Jeff Povey	28 November 2009	5.14
700	14	"As Others See Us"	David O'Neill	Mark Cairns	5 December 2009	5.04
701	15	"No More Heroes"	David O'Neill	Sally Abbott	12 December 2009	4.84
702	16	"All I Want for Christmas"	Alan Grint	Martin Jameson	19 December 2009	7.02
703	17	"Tidings of Comfort and Joy" (Note: See also "Comfort and Joy" series 8)	Alan Grint	Sasha Hails	27 December 2009	4.52
704	18	"A Day in a Life"	Patrick Harkins	Daisy Coulam & Dana Fainaru	2 January 2010	7.59
705	19	"Dark Places"	Declan Eames	Rob Williams	9 January 2010	7.24
706	20	"Leave Me Alone"	Will Sinclair	Mark Catley	16 January 2010	6.85
707	21	"Last Roll of the Dice"	Declan Eames	Sally Tatchell	23 January 2010	6.86
708	22	"The Cradle Will Fall"	Ian Barnes	Michael Levine	30 January 2010	6.55
709	23	"An Ugly Truth"	Ian Barnes	Mark Catley	6 February 2010	6.53
710	24	"Love Is a Battlefield"	Simon Meyers	Paul Logue	13 February 2010	7.13
711	25	"Past Lives"	Simon Meyers	Paul Logue & Steve Keyworth	20 February 2010	6.85
712	26	"Life Sentence"	Jonathan Fox Bassett	David Bowker	27 February 2010	6.55
713	27	"Angel"	Jonathan Fox Bassett	Jeff Povey	6 March 2010	6.23
714	28	"English Beauty"	Ben Caron	Fiona Evans & Jeff Povey	13 March 2010	6.36
715	29	"Just Like a Woman"	Ben Caron	Deborah Jones	27 March 2010	6.67
716	30	"Love of a Good Man"	Dominic Leclerc	Martin Jameson	3 April 2010	6.23
717	31	"Loves Me, Loves Me Not"	Dermot Boyd	Sasha Hails	10 April 2010	6.33
718	32	"Clean Slate"	Dominic Leclerc	Sonali Bhattacharyya	17 April 2010	6.09
719	33	"Alone on a Wide, Wide Sea"	Ian Barnes	Daisy Coulam	24 April 2010	6.44
720	34	"New Beginnings"	Ian Barnes	Richard Monks & Mark Catley	1 May 2010	6.86
721	35	"A Better Past"	Matthew Evans	Dana Fainaru	8 May 2010	6.31
722	36	"Russian Endings"	Matthew Evans	Paul Logue	15 May 2010	6.10
723	37	"Mum's the Word"	Will Sinclair	Mark Cairns	22 May 2010	6.21
724	38	"In Your Debt"	Paul Murphy	Jason Sutton	5 June 2010	4.00
725	39	"Inconvenient Truths"	Will Sinclair	Rebecca Wojciechowski	12 June 2010	3.02
726	40	"The Lesser Good"	Richard Platt	Michael Levine	19 June 2010	5.43
727	41	"Die and Let Live"	Richard Platt	Suzie Smith	26 June 2010	4.97
728	42	"Going Solo"	Declan O'Dwyer	Jeff Dodds	10 July 2010	5.33
729	43	"I Am Mine"	Declan O'Dwyer	Jeff Povey	17 July 2010	5.65
730	44	"Making Other Plans"	Simon Meyers	Martin Jameson	24 July 2010	6.05
731	45	"The Enemy Within"	Rebecca Gatward	Jon Sen	31 July 2010	5.72
732	46	"Nice and Easy Does It"	Declan Eames	Sasha Hails	7 August 2010	5.36
733	47	"What Tonight Means to Me – Part One"	Jonathan Fox Bassett	Tom Bidwell	14 August 2010	6.02
734	48	"What Tonight Means to Me – Part Two"	Jonathan Fox Bassett	Rob Williams	21 August 2010	4.69

=== Series 25 (2010–2011) ===
No. overall	No. in series	Title	Directed by	Written by	Original release date	UK viewers (millions)
735	1	"Entry Wounds"	Paul Murphy	Mark Catley	4 September 2010	5.97
736	2	"The Blame Game"	Ian Barnes	Daisy Coulam	11 September 2010	5.08
737	3	"Chaos Theory"	Ian Barnes	Tom MacRae & Mark Catley	18 September 2010	5.42
738	4	"Only the Lonely" (Note: See also "Only the Lonely" series 9, "Only the Lonely" series 16 & "Only the Lonely" series 28)	Matthew Evans	Sasha Hails	25 September 2010	5.44
739	5	"Into the Fog"	Matthew Evans	Nicola Wilson	2 October 2010	5.77
740	6	"Eliminate the Negative"	Declan O'Dwyer	Sally Abbott	9 October 2010	5.02
741	7	"Reasons Unknown"	Will Sinclair	Dana Fainaru	16 October 2010	4.68
742	8	"Employee of the Week"	Declan O'Dwyer	Hamish Wright	23 October 2010	5.17
743	9	"No Place Like Home"	Dermot Boyd	Suzie Smith	30 October 2010	5.14
744	10	"Hands On"	Dermot Boyd	Ellen Taylor	6 November 2010	5.16
745	11	"The Enemy Within"	Matthew Evans	Rachel Flowerday	13 November 2010	4.88
746	12	"Guilty Secrets"	Sunetra Sarker & Suzanne Packer	David Bowker	20 November 2010	5.40
747	13	"Truth Will Out"	Steve Brett	Tahsin Güner	27 November 2010	5.64
748	14	"Grandiosity"	Steve Brett	Marston Bloom	4 December 2010	5.34
749	15	"What Lies Beneath"	Reza Moradi	Kim Revill	11 December 2010	5.22
750	16	"Season of Goodwill"	Reza Moardi	Dana Fainaru	18 December 2010	7.37
751	17	"Winter Wonderland"	Declan O'Dwyer	Daisy Coulam	27 December 2010	4.04
752	18	"All the Time in the World"	Declan O'Dwyer	David Bowker	2 January 2011	6.95
753	19	"Epiphany"	Ed Bazalgette	Paul Logue & Deborah Jones	8 January 2011	6.89
754	20	"Altered States"	Ed Bazalgette	Jason Sutton & Rachel Flowerday	15 January 2011	6.67
755	21	"Choose Your Illusion"	Declan Eames	Rob Williams	22 January 2011	6.89
756	22	"A Lion Roars"	Declan Eames	Sally Tatchell	29 January 2011	6.91
757	23	"Place of Safety"	Paul Murphy	Dana Fainaru	5 February 2011	6.78
758	24	"Duty of Care" (Note: See also "Duty of Care" series 9 & "Duty of Care" series 26)	Paul Murphy	Jon Sen	12 February 2011	6.79
759	25	"Till Death Us Do Part"	Jon Sen	Julia Gilbert	19 February 2011	6.97
760	26	"Boys Will Be Boys"	Ben Gutteridge	Philip Gawthorne	26 February 2011	6.60
761	27	"Less Than Zero"	David O'Neill	Jeff Povey	5 March 2011	6.75
762	28	"Only Human"	David O'Neill	Lauren Klee	12 March 2011	6.69
763	29	"Secrets and Lies"	Matthew Evans	Marston Bloom	26 March 2011	6.27
764	30	"Just Because You're Paranoid"	Matthew Evans	Rachel Flowerday	2 April 2011	6.29
765	31	"Starting Over"	Will Sinclair	Tim Price	9 April 2011	5.67
766	32	"A Real Shame"	Will Sinclair	Shazia Rashid & Rachel Flowerday	16 April 2011	5.32
767	33	"Before the Fall"	Rebecca Gatward	Suzie Smith	23 April 2011	5.27
768	34	"Momentum"	Richard Platt	Paul Logue	30 April 2011	5.51
769	35	"Deception"	Richard Platt	Sally Tatchell	7 May 2011	5.67
770	36	"A Quiet Life"	Paul Murphy	Pete Hambly	21 May 2011	5.55
771	37	"When the Bough Breaks"	Paul Murphy	Sasha Hails	28 May 2011	4.85
772	38	"The Gift of Life"	Ian Barnes	Daisy Coulam	4 June 2011	5.02
773	39	"One Good Day"	Susie Watson	Tim Baker	11 June 2011	5.65
774	40	"Keep on Running – Part One"	Reza Moradi	David Bowker	18 June 2011	5.91
775	41	"Keep on Running – Part Two"	Reza Moradi	Julia Gilbert	25 June 2011	6.01
776	42	"Rogue"	Tim Leandro	Hamish Wright	2 July 2011	5.64
777	43	"Divine Intervention"	Tim Leandro	Stephen McAteer	9 July 2011	5.78
778	44	"Pascal's Wager"	Reza Moradi	Michael Levine	16 July 2011	6.18
779	45	"System Error"	Reza Moradi	Paul Logue	23 July 2011	5.83
780	46	"When You're Smiling"	Simon Meyers	Marston Bloom	30 July 2011	5.69
781	47	"Thanks For Today"	Paul Murphy	Rachel Flowerday	6 August 2011	6.09

=== Series 26 (2011–2012) ===
No. overall	No. in series	Title	Directed by	Written by	Original release date	UK viewers (millions)
782	1	"Partners"	Declan O'Dwyer	Mark Catley	13 August 2011	6.48
783	2	"Starting Out"	Declan O'Dwyer	Tim Baker	20 August 2011	5.13
784	3	"Common Vector"	Simon Massey	Steve Bailie	27 August 2011	5.19
785	4	"Memory Games"	Simon Massey	Frank Rickarby	3 September 2011	4.82
786	5	"To Have and Have Not"	Declan Eames	Rachel Flowerday	17 September 2011	5.40
787	6	"Fixed"	Declan Eames	Matthew Broughton	24 September 2011	4.72
788	7	"Wild Horses"	Steve Brett	Paul Matthew Thompson	1 October 2011	5.27
789	8	"Charlie's Angels"	Steve Brett	David Bowker	8 October 2011	5.16
790	9	"Mea Culpa"	Tim Leandro	Stephen McAteer	15 October 2011	5.45
791	10	"Sanctuary"	Tim Leandro	Tahsin Güner	22 October 2011	5.23
792	11	"Pound of Flesh"	Richard Signy	Sasha Hails	29 October 2011	5.29
793	12	"Natural Selection"	Richard Signy	Paul Coates	5 November 2011	5.02
794	13	"No Goodbyes"	Simon Meyers	Kelly Jones	19 November 2011	4.93
795	14	"The Ties That Bind" (Note: See also "The Ties That Bind" series 7, "The Ties That Bind" series 13, "The Ties That Bind" series 17 & "The Ties That Bind Us" series 19)	Simon Meyers	Frank Rickarby	26 November 2011	5.22
796	15	"Next of Kin – Part One"	Simon Massey	Patrick Homes	3 December 2011	5.01
797	16	"Next of Kin – Part Two"	Simon Massey	Sally Abbott	10 December 2011	5.31
798	17	"Duty of Care" (Note: See also "Duty of Care" series 9 & "Duty of Care" series 25)	Reza Moradi	Paul Logue	7 January 2012	6.99
799	18	"Death & Doughnuts"	Simon Meyers	Steve Bailie	14 January 2012	6.81
800	19	"Trust"	Declan O'Dwyer	Rachel Flowerday	21 January 2012	6.61
801	20	"Hero Syndrome"	Declan O'Dwyer	Nicola Wilson	28 January 2012	6.24
802	21	"The Only One You Love"	Jon Sen	Marston Bloom	4 February 2012	6.68
803	22	"Confidences"	Jon Sen	Tony McHale	11 February 2012	6.36
804	23	"Love Is"	Nigel Douglas	Paul Logue	18 February 2012	6.35
805	24	"Grand Canyon"	Nigel Douglas	Dana Fainaru	25 February 2012	6.10
806	25	"Ricochet: How to Save a Life"	Richard Platt	David Bowker	3 March 2012	6.04
807	26	"Ricochet: Damage Control"	Richard Platt	Andrea Page	10 March 2012	6.08
808	27	"Ricochet: What Goes Around Comes Around"	Richard Platt	Emma Goodwin	17 March 2012	5.83
809	28	"Lest Ye Be Judged"	Steve Hughes	Chris Ould	24 March 2012	5.55
810	29	"Saturday Night Fever"	Declan O'Dwyer	Sasha Hails	31 March 2012	5.66
811	30	"When the Gloves Come Off"	Declan O'Dwyer	Stephen McAteer	7 April 2012	5.63
812	31	"Fools for Love"	Richard Signy	Fiona Peek	14 April 2012	5.84
813	32	"Desperate Remedies"	Richard Signy	Frank Rickarby	21 April 2012	5.61
814	33	"Appropriate Force"	Paul Murphy	Steve Bailie	28 April 2012	5.50
815	34	"Happily Ever After"	Paul Murphy	Peter McKenna	5 May 2012	5.06
816	35	"Home Truths"	Ashley Way	Julian Perkins	12 May 2012	4.37
817	36	"Teenage Dreams"	Ashley Way	Matthew Barry	19 May 2012	5.00
818	37	"All in a Day's Nightmare – Part One"	Jon Sen	Tony McHale	2 June 2012	5.60
819	38	"All in a Day's Nightmare – Part Two"	Jon Sen	Tony McHale	8 June 2012	5.64
820	39	"Zero Sum Game"	Graeme Harper	Kelly Jones	7 July 2012	4.92
821	40	"Do the Right Thing"	Graeme Harper	Emma Goodwin	14 July 2012	5.35
822	41	"#HolbyRiot – Part One"	Reza Moradi	Sally Abbott	21 July 2012	5.21
823	42	"#HolbyRiot – Part Two"	Reza Moradi	Sasha Hails	22 July 2012	5.13

=== Series 27 (2012–2013) ===
No. overall	No. in series	Title	Directed by	Written by	Original release date	UK viewers (millions)
824	1	"Kansas"	Nigel Douglas	Stephen McAteer	18 August 2012	5.19
825	2	"Cuckoo's Nest"	Nigel Douglas	Steve Bailie	25 August 2012	5.16
826	3	"Rock, Paper, Scissors"	Robert Del Maestro	Anita Pandolfo	1 September 2012	5.11
827	4	"An Amateur Sport"	Robert Del Maestro	Christian O'Reilly	15 September 2012	5.49
828	5	"I'll See You in My Dreams"	Jon Sen	David Bowker	22 September 2012	5.03
829	6	"Evolve or Be Extinct"	Jon Sen	Andrew Rattenbury	29 September 2012	4.66
830	7	"Tough Love"	Sallie Aprahamian	Ben Tagoe & Tony McHale	6 October 2012	4.88
831	8	"The Kindness of Strangers"	Sallie Aprahamian	Kelly Jones	13 October 2012	4.80
832	9	"Harvest Festival"	Graeme Harper	Sasha Hails	20 October 2012	5.13
833	10	"Seeing in the Dark"	Graeme Harper	Julie Dixon	27 October 2012	5.17
834	11	"When Love Breaks Down"	Tim Leandro	Frank Rickarby	3 November 2012	5.03
835	12	"Out of the Blue"	Tim Leandro	Dana Fainaru	17 November 2012	4.70
836	13	"Sixteen Candles"	Jill Robertson	Katie Douglas	24 November 2012	4.67
837	14	"My Aim Is True"	Jill Robertson	Tom Needham	1 December 2012	4.65
838	15	"The Blame Game"	Steve Hughes	Kevin Rundle	8 December 2012	4.75
839	16	"I Saw Mommy Killing Santa Claus"	Steve Hughes	Stephen McAteer	15 December 2012	5.74
840	17	"Rabbits in Headlights"	Jon Sen	Sasha Hails	5 January 2013	6.02
841	18	"Smoke and Mirrors"	Richard Signy	Steve Bailie	12 January 2013	5.86
842	19	"No Other Medicine"	Richard Signy	Kelly Jones	19 January 2013	6.07
843	20	"Broken Heart Syndrome"	Reza Moradi	David Bowker	26 January 2013	6.00
844	21	"Life Goes On"	Reza Moradi	Tony McHale	2 February 2013	5.90
845	22	"If Not for You"	Simon Meyers	Andrew Rattenbury	9 February 2013	6.49
846	23	"Ostrich Syndrome"	Simon Meyers	Anita Pandolfo	16 February 2013	6.23
847	24	"Though Lovers Be Lost"	Paul Murphy	Kelly Jones	23 February 2013	5.75
848	25	"Brave New World"	Paul Murphy	Julian Perkins	2 March 2013	5.70
849	26	"Cross Roads"	Robert Del Maestro	Tom Higgins	9 March 2013	5.73
850	27	"With and Without You"	Robert Del Maestro	Chris Ould	16 March 2013	5.65
851	28	"And the Walls Come Tumbling Down"	Joss Agnew	Emma Goodwin	23 March 2013	5.91
852	29	"Punch Drunk Love"	Joss Agnew	Steph Lloyd Jones	30 March 2013	5.38
853	30	"Hidden"	Reza Moradi	Julie Dixon	6 April 2013	6.09
854	31	"Unsilenced"	Reza Moradi	Sasha Hails	13 April 2013	5.34
855	32	"Family Matters" (Note: See also "Family Matters" series 7 & "Family Matters" series 20)	Richard Platt	Steve Bailie	20 April 2013	5.90
856	33	"Human Resources"	Richard Platt	Tim Loane	27 April 2013	5.60
857	34	"The Morning After"	Declan O'Dwyer	Matthew Hall & Emma Goodwin	4 May 2013	5.89
858	35	"Isolated Incident"	Declan O'Dwyer	Kevin Rundle	11 May 2013	5.62
859	36	"The Milk of Human Kindness"	Steve Hughes	Kelly Jones	25 May 2013	5.11
860	37	"Love Is the Drug"	Lee Haven Jones	Kelly Jones	1 June 2013	5.13
861	38	"You Always Hurt the One You Love"	Tim Leandro	Andrew Rattenbury	8 June 2013	3.94
862	39	"Garage Flowers"	Tim Leandro	Tim Loane	15 June 2013	5.37
863	40	"What Goes Up"	Matthew Evans	Stephen McAteer	22 June 2013	5.55
864	41	"Letting Go"	Matthew Evans	Tom Higgins	29 June 2013	4.65
865	42	"A History of Violence"	Karl Neilson	Emma Goodwin	6 July 2013	4.99
866	43	"Secrets and Lies"	Simon Massey	Anita Pandolfo	13 July 2013	5.00
867	44	"Mistakes Happen"	Simon Massey	Tony McHale	20 July 2013	5.18

=== Series 28 (2013–2014) ===
No. overall	No. in series	Title	Directed by	Written by	Original release date	UK viewers (millions)
868	1	"Bedside Manners"	Jon Sen	Steve Bailie	3 August 2013	5.18
869	2	"Once There Was a Way Home – Part One"	Robert Del Maestro	Frank Rickarby	10 August 2013	5.11
870	3	"Once There Was a Way Home – Part Two"	Robert Del Maestro	Sasha Hails	17 August 2013	5.24
871	4	"What You Believe"	Jon Sen	Chris Ould	24 August 2013	5.20
872	5	"Waiting for a Star to Fall"	Reza Moradi	David Bowker	31 August 2013	4.66
873	6	"Scars"	Reza Moradi	Stephen McAteer	14 September 2013	5.05
874	7	"Gloves Off"	Julie Edwards	Christian O'Reilly	21 September 2013	5.22
875	8	"The Longest Day"	Julie Edwards	Julie Dixon	28 September 2013	4.99
876	9	"Love Hurts"	Steve Hughes	Andy Rattenbury	5 October 2013	5.03
877	10	"The Memory of Water"	Steve Hughes	Tom Needham & Mark Catley	12 October 2013	5.03
878	11	"Crush Syndrome"	Tim Leandro	Kevin Rundle	19 October 2013	5.12
879	12	"Three's a Crowd"	Tim Leandro	Kit Lambert	26 October 2013	4.76
880	13	"Badge of Honour"	David Tucker	Robert Goldsbrough	2 November 2013	5.07
881	14	"Rock and a Hard Place"	David Tucker	Tony McHale	16 November 2013	4.95
882	15	"Between the Cracks"	Neasa Hardiman	Sally Abbott	23 November 2013	5.41
883	16	"No Place Like Home"	Neasa Hardiman	Emma Goodwin	30 November 2013	4.65
884	17	"What a Wonderful Life"	Robert Del Maestro	Tim Loane	7 December 2013	4.49
885	18	"Away in a Manger"	Robert Del Maestro	Sasha Hails	14 December 2013	4.65
886	19	"For Auld Lang Syne" (Note: See also "For Auld Lang Syne" series 22)	Tim Leandro	Tony McHale	4 January 2014	5.44
887	20	"Bad Timing"	Steve Hughes	Frank Rickarby	11 January 2014	6.06
888	21	"Brothers in Arms"	Steve Hughes	Steve Bailie	18 January 2014	5.72
889	22	"Keeping Schtum"	Graeme Harper	Katherine Smith	25 January 2014	5.66
890	23	"Blood Is Thicker Than Water" (Note: See also "Blood's Thicker" series 9, "Thicker Than Water" series 11 & "Thicker Than Water" series 17)	Graeme Harper	Anita Pandolfo	1 February 2014	6.14
891	24	"Once in a Lifetime"	Joss Agnew	Kevin Rundle	8 February 2014	6.28
892	25	"Valentine's Day Mascara"	Joss Agnew	Mark Catley	15 February 2014	6.04
893	26	"The Great Pretender"	Reza Moradi	Tony McHale	22 February 2014	5.87
894	27	"The Last Chance Saloon"	Reza Moradi	Matthew Barry	1 March 2014	6.15
895	28	"Survivor's Guilt"	Paul Murphy	Kevin Rundle	8 March 2014	6.03
896	29	"Gravity"	Paul Murphy	Stephen McAteer	15 March 2014	6.15
897	30	"The Lies We Tell"	Lee Haven Jones	Henrietta Hardy	22 March 2014	6.59
898	31	"Valves to Vagrants"	Lee Haven Jones	Tony McHale	29 March 2014	6.13
899	32	"The Quiet Man"	Simon Massey	Jason Sutton	5 April 2014	6.02
900	33	"Only the Lonely" (Note: See also "Only the Lonely" series 9, "Only the Lonely" series 16 & "Only the Lonely" series 25)	Simon Massey	Patrea Smallacombe	12 April 2014	4.77
901	34	"When Nothing Else Matters"	Ashley Way	Mark Stevenson	19 April 2014	5.22
902	35	"Carrot Not Stick"	Steve Hughes	Nick Fisher	26 April 2014	5.58
903	36	"Who Cares?"	Ashley Way	Sally Tatchell	3 May 2014	5.74
904	37	"Games for Boys"	Nigel Douglas	Tim Loane	17 May 2014	4.42
905	38	"The Family Way"	Nigel Douglas	Tony McHale	24 May 2014	4.80
906	39	"To Yourself Be True"	Julie Edwards	Julie Dixon	31 May 2014	5.08
907	40	"The Dying Game"	Julie Edwards	Steve Bailie	7 June 2014	4.57
908	41	"Unhinged"	Jon Sen	Sasha Hails & Mark Catley	14 June 2014	4.86
909	42	"Falling – Part One"	Jon Sen	Sally Abbott	22 June 2014	5.20
910	43	"Falling – Part Two"	Simon Massey	Nick Fisher	29 June 2014	4.86
911	44	"In the Name of Love"	Simon Massey	Trea Smallacombe	6 July 2014	5.91
912	45	"First Impressions" (Note: See also "First Impressions" series 9, "First Impressions" series 18 & "First Impressions" series 20)	Richard Platt	Claire Miller	12 July 2014	4.82
913	46	"The Love You Take"	Richard Platt	Kelly Jones	9 August 2014	4.93
914	47	"The Sicilian Defence"	Graeme Harper	Paul Matthew Thompson	16 August 2014	5.03
915	48	"A Life Less Lived"	Graeme Harper	Patrick Homes	23 August 2014	5.00

=== Series 29 (2014–2015) ===
No. overall	No. in series	Title	Directed by	Written by	Original release date	UK viewers (millions)
916	1	"Learning to Fly"	Nigel Douglas	Tony McHale	30 August 2014	4.90
917	2	"Fallen Stars"	David Innes Edwards	Anita Pandolfo	6 September 2014	4.65
918	3	"Home"	Joss Agnew	Mark Catley	20 September 2014	4.78
919	4	"Go Out and Get Busy"	Nigel Douglas	Matthew Barry	27 September 2014	4.90
920	5	"Born Lucky"	Steve Hughes	Kevin Rundle	4 October 2014	5.75
921	6	"The Last Call"	Steve Hughes	Emma Goodwin	11 October 2014	5.48
922	7	"The Index Case"	Joss Agnew	Steve Bailie	18 October 2014	4.90
923	8	"Return to Sender"	Matthew Evans	Matthew Barry	25 October 2014	5.07
924	9	"Entrenched"	Matthew Evans	Dale Overton	1 November 2014	5.35
925	10	"Deadfall"	David Innes Edwards	Jeff Povey	15 November 2014	5.06
926	11	"Asylum"	Julie Edwards	Henrietta Hardy	22 November 2014	4.61
927	12	"Losing Grip"	Julie Edwards	Asher Pirie	29 November 2014	4.76
928	13	"Feeling Good"	Steve Brett	Matthew Barry	6 December 2014	4.72
929	14	"Solomon's Song"	Steve Brett	Jeff Povey	13 December 2014	4.46
930	15	"Next Year's Words"	David Tucker	Kelly Jones	3 January 2015	5.51
931	16	"Clinging On"	David Tucker	Kit Lambert	10 January 2015	6.06
932	17	"Muddling Through"	David Beauchamp	Gillian Richmond	17 January 2015	6.19
933	18	"The Last Goodbye"	David Innes Edwards	Mark Catley & Tom Higgins	24 January 2015	6.19
934	19	"What a Difference a Day Makes"	David Innes Edwards	Suzie Smith	31 January 2015	6.02
935	20	"Front Line"	Michael Owen Morris	Joe Williams	7 February 2015	6.22
936	21	"Sweetie"	Michael Owen Morris	Sally Abbott	14 February 2015	6.07
937	22	"Sweet Little Lies"	Julie Edwards	Lucia Haynes	21 February 2015	5.77
938	23	"Something to Live For"	Julie Edwards	Stephen McAteer	28 February 2015	5.86
939	24	"Excess Baggage"	Rebecca Gatward	Emma Goodwin	7 March 2015	6.15
940	25	"Toxic Relationships"	Rebecca Gatward	Anita Pandolfo & Mark Stevenson	14 March 2015	6.07
941	26	"The Road Not Taken"	Ian Barnes	Barbara Machin	28 March 2015	5.88
942	27	"Something Borrowed, Something Blue"	Jo Johnson	Paul Matthew Thompson	4 April 2015	5.80
943	28	"Under Pressure"	Jo Johnson	Kate Verghese	11 April 2015	5.34
944	29	"The King's Crossing"	Seán Gleeson	Andy Bayliss	18 April 2015	5.02
945	30	"The Rita Supremacy"	Seán Gleeson	Jeff Povey	25 April 2015	5.49
946	31	"The Department of Secrets"	Simon Massey	Paul Matthew Thompson	2 May 2015	5.31
947	32	"Exile"	Steve Hughes	Kelly Jones	16 May 2015	5.28
948	33	"Against the Odds"	Graeme Harper	Steve Bailie	30 May 2015	5.28
949	34	"Fix You"	Graeme Harper	Mark Stevenson	6 June 2015	4.71
950	35	"The Way Home"	Steve Brett	Jon Sen	13 June 2015	5.06
951	36	"The Golden Hours"	Steve Brett	Jude Tindall	20 June 2015	5.08
952	37	"A Moment of Clarity"	Claire Winyard	Claire Miller	27 June 2015	5.08
953	38	"Heart over Head"	Claire Winyard	Mark Catley and Amber Trentham	4 July 2015	5.04
954	39	"Holby Sin City"	Simon Massey	Mark Catley	11 July 2015	5.13
955	40	"If You Could Bottle It"	Steve Hughes	Nick Fisher	18 July 2015	5.25
956	41	"The Next Step"	Steve Hughes	Julie Dixon	25 July 2015	5.30
957	42	"Dark Horses"	Seán Gleeson	Tony McHale	1 August 2015	5.14
958	43	"The Long Haul"	Seán Gleeson	Steven Fay & Tony Green	8 August 2015	5.35
959	44	"Knock Knock Who's There?"	Julie Edwards	Benedict Ayrton & Matthew Barry	15 August 2015	5.37
960	45	"Forsaking All Others – Part One"	Jordan Hogg	Asher Pirie	22 August 2015	5.81
961	46	"Forsaking All Others – Part Two"	Julie Edwards	Matthew Barry	23 August 2015	6.44

=== Series 30 (2015–2016) ===
No. overall	No. in series	Title	Directed by	Written by	Original release date	UK viewers (millions)
962	1	"A Child's Heart – Part One"	Paul Unwin	Paul Unwin	29 August 2015	5.73
963	2	"A Child's Heart – Part Two"	Paul Unwin	Paul Unwin	30 August 2015	6.33
964	3	"Objectum Sexual"	Claire Winyard	Jeff Povey	5 September 2015	5.95
965	4	"Cradle to Grave"	Claire Winyard	Kelly Jones	19 September 2015	5.55
966	5	"Belief"	Steve Hughes	Mark Catley	26 September 2015	5.20
967	6	"All the Single Ladies"	Steve Hughes	Mark Catley	3 October 2015	5.18
968	7	"Rules of Attraction"	Diarmuid Goggins	Joe Williams	10 October 2015	5.62
969	8	"Flutterby"	Steve Brett	Emily Groves & Mark Catley	17 October 2015	5.79
970	9	"One Shot"	Steve Brett	Jon Sen	24 October 2015	5.29
971	10	"Best Served Cold"	Jo Johnson	Nick Fisher	31 October 2015	5.00
972	11	"Avoidable Harm"	Jo Johnson	Matthew Barry	14 November 2015	5.18
973	12	"Strangers"	Sean Glynn	Andy Bayliss	21 November 2015	5.16
974	13	"Estranged"	Sean Glynn	Mark Stevenson	28 November 2015	5.25
975	14	"Maybe This Year"	Seán Gleeson	Jeff Povey	5 December 2015	5.22
976	15	"Silence Speaks"	Seán Gleeson	Claire Miller	12 December 2015	5.67
977	16	"Home for Christmas"	Jamie Annett	Sally Abbott & Mark Catley	19 December 2015	6.88
978	17	"A Life Less Ordinary"	Steve Brett	Barbara Machin	2 January 2016	6.19
979	18	"Lie to Me"	Jamie Annett	Kim Millar	9 January 2016	6.38
980	19	"Black Alert"	David Beauchamp	Matthew Barry	16 January 2016	5.94
981	20	"Shame"	David Beauchamp	Asher Pirie	23 January 2016	6.19
982	21	"The Good Life"	Jo Johnson	Patrick Homes	30 January 2016	6.13
983	22	"Step Right Up"	Jo Johnson	Robert Butler	6 February 2016	6.33
984	23	"Hearts and Flowers"	David Innes Edwards	Dominique Moloney	13 February 2016	6.24
985	24	"Just Do It"	David Innes Edwards	Dana Fainaru	20 February 2016	6.17
986	25	"Fatal Error – Part One"	Steve Brett	Matt Cooke, Vincent Lund & Mark Catley	27 February 2016	5.99
987	26	"Fatal Error – Part Two"	Steve Brett	Emily Groves	5 March 2016	6.32
988	27	"High Tide"	Julie Edwards	Kelly Jones	12 March 2016	5.93
989	28	"Sweet Child of Mine"	Julie Edwards	Mark Stevenson	26 March 2016	5.51
990	29	"Buried Alive"	David Beauchamp	Matthew Barry	2 April 2016	5.96
991	30	"Hopelessly Addicted"	David Beauchamp	Kayleigh Llewellyn	9 April 2016	6.14
992	31	"Survivors"	Lee Haven-Jones	Claire Miller	16 April 2016	5.03
993	32	"A Clear Conscience"	Lee Haven-Jones	Joe Williams	23 April 2016	5.13
994	33	"Tangled Webs We Weave"	Steve Hughes	Mark Catley	30 April 2016	5.08
995	34	"Hello, I Must Be Going"	Steve Hughes	Jeff Povey	7 May 2016	5.03
996	35	"Chain Reaction" (Note: See also "Chain Reaction" series 4 & "Chain Reactions" series 11)	Jermain Julien	Jon Sen	21 May 2016	5.44
997	36	"This Life"	Jermain Julien	Kim Millar	28 May 2016	4.14
998	37	"The Best Day of My Life"	Julie Edwards	Ben Ayrton & Jeff Povey	4 June 2016	4.95
999	38	"You Make Me Sick"	Julie Edwards	John Yorke	11 June 2016	4.54
1000	39	"History Repeating"	Sean Glynn	Rebecca Wojciechowski	25 June 2016	4.81
1001	40	"What Lies Beneath"	Sean Glynn	Dominique Moloney	3 July 2016	4.62
1002	41	"Where the Truth Lies"	David Innes Edwards	Henrietta Hardy & Jeff Povey	9 July 2016	5.08
1003	42	"The Fear"	Louise Hooper	Asher Pirie & Jon Sen	16 July 2016	5.15
1004	43	"Sticks and Stones"	David Innes Edwards	Claire Miller	30 July 2016	5.20

=== Series 31 (2016–2017) ===
No. overall	No. in series	Title	Directed by	Written by	Original release date	UK viewers (millions)
1005–1006	1	"Too Old for This Shift"	Steve Hughes	Matthew Barry & Andy Bayliss	27 August 2016	7.20
1007	2	"Fall on Me"	Seán Gleeson	Mark Stevenson	3 September 2016	6.45
1008	3	"Strike Three"	Seán Gleeson	Claire Miller	10 September 2016	5.34
1009	4	"Pride Comes Before a Fall"	Rick Platt	Suzanne Cowie	17 September 2016	5.57
1010	5	"Schoolboy Crush"	Rick Platt	Kayleigh Llewellyn	24 September 2016	5.64
1011	6	"Party Pooper"	Diarmuid Goggins	Rachel Aird	1 October 2016	5.78
1012	7	"Too Much Love Will Kill You"	Diarmuid Goggins	Tony Higgins	8 October 2016	5.56
1013	8	"The Big Day"	Julie Edwards	Tom Higgins & Mark Catley	15 October 2016	5.65
1014	9	"Night of the Loving Dead"	Amanda Mealing	Jeff Povey	22 October 2016	5.72
1015	10	"Shock to the System"	Tracey Larcombe	Jon Sen	29 October 2016	5.76
1016	11	"Thirty Years"	Paul Riordan	Kelly Jones	5 November 2016	5.79
1017	12	"About My Mother"	Paul Riordan	Kim Millar	19 November 2016	5.89
1018	13	"Not in Holby Anymore"	Matthew Evans	Simon Norman	26 November 2016	5.80
1019	14	"All I Want for Christmas Is You"	Matthew Evans	Rebecca Wojciechowski	3 December 2016	5.75
1020	15	"Bah Humbug"	David Beauchamp	Dominique Moloney	10 December 2016	5.73
1021	16	"New Me, New Year, New You"	David Beauchamp	Sarah Beeson	31 December 2016	5.26
1022	17	"What Lurks in the Heart"	Jamie Annett	Rachel Smith	7 January 2017	5.97
1023	18	"Back to School"	Jamie Annett	Laura Poliakoff	14 January 2017	5.93
1024	19	"Little Sister"	Fiona Walton	Joseph Wilde & Jeff Povey	21 January 2017	5.98
1025	20	"Crazy Little Thing Called Love"	Fiona Walton	Mark Stevenson	28 January 2017	5.61
1026	21	"The Stag, the Dog and the Sheep"	Seán Gleeson	Jeff Povey	4 February 2017	5.99
1027	22	"You Are Your Only Limit"	Seán Gleeson	Dana Fainaru	11 February 2017	5.72
1028	23	"Binge Britain"	Paul Riordan	Laura Poliakoff	18 February 2017	5.99
1029	24	"Slipping Under"	Paul Riordan	Jason Sutton	25 February 2017	5.88
1030	25	"It Starts with the Shoes"	Jo Johnson	Kim Millar	4 March 2017	5.29
1031	26	"The Good Samaritan"	Jo Johnson	Mark Catley	11 March 2017	5.43
1032	27	"Mobile"	Alex Jacob	Mark Catley	18 March 2017	5.52
1033	28	"Five Days"	Julie Edwards	Barbara Machin	25 March 2017	5.65
1034	29	"Sleeping with the Enemy"	Simon Massey	Steve Bailie	1 April 2017	5.45
1035	30	"Child of Mine"	Simon Massey	Jessica Ruston	8 April 2017	5.57
1036	31	"When the Whistle Blows"	Tracey Larcombe	John Yorke	15 April 2017	4.73
1037	32	"Reap the Whirlwind – Part One"	Steve Brett	Jon Sen	22 April 2017	4.98
1038	33	"Reap the Whirlwind – Part Two"	Steve Brett	Dominique Moloney	29 April 2017	5.37
1039	34	"Break Point"	David Innes Edwards	Simon Norman	6 May 2017	5.38
1040	35	"End of the Road"	Lynsey Miller	Joe Williams & Kelly Jones	20 May 2017	5.21
1041	36	"Roadman"	Alex Jacob	Mark Catley	3 June 2017	4.88
1042	37	"Swift Vengeance Waits"	Judith Dine	Rachel Smith	10 June 2017	5.17
1043	38	"Do Not Stand at My Grave and Weep"	Judith Dine	Dana Fainaru	17 June 2017	5.04
1044	39	"It Had to Be You"	Graham Sherrington	Matthew Barry & Mark Stevenson	24 June 2017	5.30
1045	40	"War of the Roses"	Graham Sherrington	Rachel Aird	1 July 2017	5.21
1046	41	"Man Up"	Shaun Evans	Suzanne Cowie	8 July 2017	5.09
1047	42	"Somewhere Between Silences − Part One"	Fiona Walton	Paul Matthew Thompson	15 July 2017	5.43
1048	43	"Somewhere Between Silences − Part Two"	Fiona Walton	Jeff Povey	22 July 2017	5.67
1049	44	"One"	Jon Sen	Paul Unwin	29 July 2017	6.57

=== Series 32 (2017–2018) ===
No. overall	No. in series	Episode	Directed by	Written by	Original release date	UK viewers (millions)
1050	1	Episode 1	Steve Brett	Dana Fainaru	19 August 2017	4.99
1051	2	Episode 2	Steve Brett	Dominique Moloney	26 August 2017	5.02
1052	3	Episode 3	James Larkin	Laura Poliakoff	2 September 2017	4.81
1053	4	Episode 4	James Larkin	Tony Higgins	16 September 2017	4.92
1054	5	Episode 5	Paul Riordan	Kayleigh Llewellyn	23 September 2017	5.95
1055	6	Episode 6	Paul Riordan	Oliver Frampton	30 September 2017	5.77
1056	7	Episode 7	Carolina Giammetta	Claire Miller	7 October 2017	5.80
1057	8	Episode 8	Carolina Giammetta	Sarah Beeson	14 October 2017	5.85
1058	9	Episode 9	John Greening	Matthew Barry	21 October 2017	6.12
1059	10	Episode 10	John Greening	Kim Millar	28 October 2017	5.73
1060	11	Episode 11	Matthew Evans	Jeff Povey	4 November 2017	6.03
1061	12	Episode 12	Matthew Evans	Simon Norman	11 November 2017	6.16
1062	13	Episode 13	Jordan Hogg	Mark Catley	18 November 2017	5.66
1063	14	Episode 14	Jordan Hogg	Asher Pirie	25 November 2017	5.50
1064	15	Episode 15	Roberto Bangura	Steve Bailie	2 December 2017	5.09
1065	16	Episode 16	Roberto Bangura	Dominique Moloney	9 December 2017	5.28
1066	17	Episode 17	Julie Edwards	Rebecca Wojciechowski	23 December 2017	5.33
1067	18	Episode 18	Julie Edwards	Dana Fainaru	6 January 2018	4.90
1068	19	Episode 19	Judith Dine	Matthew Barry & Kelly Jones	13 January 2018	5.16
1069	20	Episode 20	Judith Dine	Jerome Bucchan-Nelson & Matthew Barry	20 January 2018	5.05
1070	21	Episode 21	Fiona Walton	Jon Sen	27 January 2018	5.10
1071	22	Episode 22	Fiona Walton	Michelle Lipton	3 February 2018	5.37
1072	23	Episode 23	Tracey Larcombe	Dominique Moloney	10 February 2018	5.20
1073	24	Episode 24	Tracey Larcombe	Jason Sutton	17 February 2018	5.18
1074	25	Episode 25	Jordan Hogg	Jon Sen	24 February 2018	5.05
1075	26	Episode 26	Jordan Hogg	Steve Bailie	3 March 2018	5.23
1076	27	Episode 27	Paul Riordan	Tom McKay & Jeff Povey	10 March 2018	4.93
1077	28	Episode 28	Paul Riordan	Oliver Frampton	17 March 2018	4.92
1078	29	Episode 29	Amanda Mealing	Jeff Povey	24 March 2018	5.31
1079	30	Episode 30	Amanda Mealing	Rebecca Wojciechowski	31 March 2018	5.22
1080	31	Episode 31	Alex Jacob	Laura Poliakoff & Claire Miller	7 April 2018	5.01
1081	32	Episode 32	Alex Jacob	Oliver Frampton	14 April 2018	4.64
1082	33	Episode 33	Steve Hughes	Aisling Kiely & Jeff Povey	28 April 2018	4.76
1083	34	Episode 34	Steve Hughes	Rachel Aird	5 May 2018	4.64
1084	35	Episode 35	Shaun Evans	Julie Dixon	19 May 2018	4.56
1085	36	Episode 36	Shaun Evans	Debbie Owen	26 May 2018	4.57
1086	37	Episode 37	Jon Sen	Jon Sen	2 June 2018	4.37
1087	38	Episode 38	Karen Kelly	Hamish Wright	9 June 2018	4.77
1088	39	Episode 39	Roberto Bangura	Jess O'Kane & Jeff Povey	16 June 2018	4.59
1089	40	Episode 40	Roberto Bangura	Steve Bailie	23 June 2018	4.52
1090	41	Episode 41	Paulette Randall	Michelle Lipton	14 July 2018	4.73
1091	42	Episode 42	Paulette Randall	Oliver Frampton	21 July 2018	4.53
1092	43	Episode 43	Fiona Walton	Hamish Wright	28 July 2018	5.09
1093	44	Episode 44	Fiona Walton	Barbara Machin	4 August 2018	4.99

=== Series 33 (2018–2019) ===
No. overall	No. in series	Episode	Directed by	Written by	Original release date	UK viewers (millions)
1094	1	Episode 1	Steve Brett	Simon Norman	11 August 2018	5.83
1095	2	Episode 2	Steve Brett	Patrick Homes	18 August 2018	5.30
1096	3	Episode 3	Thomas Hescott	Marissa Lestrade & Steve Bailie	25 August 2018	5.37
1097	4	Episode 4	Thomas Hescott	Jeff Povey	1 September 2018	5.23
1098	5	Episode 5	Judith Dine	Jerome Bucchan-Nelson & Dana Fainaru	15 September 2018	5.12
1099	6	Episode 6	Judith Dine	Chris Murray	22 September 2018	6.00
1100	7	Episode 7	Alex Jacob	Jon Sen	29 September 2018	5.46
1101	8	Episode 8	Alex Jacob	Rachel Paterson	6 October 2018	5.97
1102	9	Episode 9	Jordan Hogg	Dana Fainaru	13 October 2018	5.92
1103	10	Episode 10	Jordan Hogg	Oliver Frampton	20 October 2018	5.74
1104	11	Episode 11	James Bryce	Jason Sutton	27 October 2018	6.07
1105	12	Episode 12	James Bryce	Rob Gittins	3 November 2018	5.73
1106	13	Episode 13	Julie Edwards	Dana Fainaru	17 November 2018	5.38
1107	14	Episode 14	Julie Edwards	Steve Bailie	24 November 2018	5.10
1108	15	Episode 15	Eric Styles	Dana Fainaru	1 December 2018	5.05
1109	16	Episode 16	Eric Styles	Katie Douglas	8 December 2018	N/A (<4.72) (Note: Not reported in the weekly top 15 programmes for four-screen viewer ratings.)
1110	17	Episode 17	Paul Riordan	Oliver Frampton	22 December 2018	4.38
1111	18	Episode 18	Matthew Evans	Katie Douglas	5 January 2019	N/A (<5.63)
1112	19	Episode 19	Matthew Evans	Julie Dixon	12 January 2019	5.25
1113	20	Episode 20	Paul Riordan	Rebecca Wojciechowski	19 January 2019	5.22
1114	21	Episode 21	David Innes Edwards	Pete Lawson	26 January 2019	4.92
1115	22	Episode 22	David Innes Edwards	Rachel Paterson	2 February 2019	N/A (<4.90)
1116	23	Episode 23	James Bryce	Debbie Owen	9 February 2019	4.83
1117	24	Episode 24	James Bryce	Chris Murray	16 February 2019	4.87
1118	25	Episode 25	Fiona Walton	Simon Norman	23 February 2019	4.93
1119	26	Episode 26	Steve Brett	Michelle Lipton	2 March 2019	5.91
1120	27	Episode 27	Andy Newbery	Oliver Frampton	9 March 2019	5.06
1121	28	Episode 28	Andy Newbery	Hamish Wright	23 March 2019	4.62
1122	29	Episode 29	Paul Riordan	Chris Lindsay and Nick Fisher	30 March 2019	4.74
1123	30	Episode 30	Kate Saxon	Kim Millar	6 April 2019	4.74
1124	31	Episode 31	Kate Saxon	Jeff Povey	13 April 2019	4.43
1125	32	Episode 32	Dafydd Palfrey	Avril E Russell and Mark Catley	20 April 2019	4.15
1126	33	Episode 33	Paul Riordan	Barbara Machin	27 April 2019	4.11
1127	34	Episode 34	Daikin Marsh	Dana Fainaru	4 May 2019	4.82
1128	35	Episode 35	Daikin Marsh	Oliver Frampton	11 May 2019	4.37
1129	36	Episode 36	Eric Styles	Rob Gittins	25 May 2019	4.15
1130	37	Episode 37	Eric Styles	Pete Lawson	1 June 2019	3.98
1131	38	Episode 38	Fiona Walton	Chris Murray	8 June 2019	4.44
1132	39	Episode 39	Fiona Walton	Johanne McAndrew and Elliot Hope	15 June 2019	4.48
1133	40	Episode 40	Nimer Rashed	Claire Miller	22 June 2019	4.33
1134	41	Episode 41	Julie Edwards	Rachel Paterson	29 June 2019	3.99
1135	42	Episode 42	Julie Edwards	Isla Gray	13 July 2019	4.24
1136	43	Episode 43	Piotr Szkopiak	Dana Fainaru	20 July 2019	4.22
1137	44	Episode 44	Piotr Szkopiak	Nick Fisher and Dana Fainaru	27 July 2019	4.28
1138	45	Episode 45	James Bryce	Colin Bytheway	3 August 2019	4.49
1139	46	Episode 46	Alex Jacob	Hilary Frankland, Patrick Homes & Katie Douglas	10 August 2019	4.94

=== Series 34 (2019–2020) ===
No. overall	No. in series	Episode	Directed by	Written by	Original release date	UK viewers (millions)
1140	1	Episode 1	Steve Brett	Mark Catley	17 August 2019	4.93
1141	2	Episode 2	Steve Brett	Rebecca Wojciechowski	24 August 2019	4.80
1142	3	Episode 3	Fiona Walton	Debbie Owen	31 August 2019	4.59
1143	4	Episode 4	Fiona Walton	Johanne McAndrew and Elliot Hope	7 September 2019	5.05
1144	5	Episode 5	Paul Riordan	Hamish Wright and Dana Fainaru	21 September 2019	5.21
1145	6	Episode 6	Paul Riordan	Julie Dixon and Mark Catley	28 September 2019	5.20
1146	7	Episode 7	Matt Hilton	Rachel Paterson	5 October 2019	5.10
1147	8	Episode 8	Matt Hilton	Colin Bytheway	12 October 2019	5.11
1148	9	Episode 9	Steve Hughes	Sumerah Srivastav and Colin Bytheway	19 October 2019	5.02
1149	10	Episode 10	Laura Smith	Pete Lawson	26 October 2019	4.66
1150	11	Episode 11	Eric Styles	Gerard Sempaio	2 November 2019	N/A (<4.94)
1151	12	Episode 12	Eric Styles	Katie Douglas	16 November 2019	4.84
1152	13	Episode 13	David Innes Edwards	Kim Millar, Johanne McAndrew and Elliot Hope	23 November 2019	4.66
1153	14	Episode 14	David Innes Edwards	Isla Gray	30 November 2019	4.88
1154	15	Episode 15	Piotr Szkopiak	Mark Catley and Colin Bytheway	7 December 2019	4.82
1155	16	Episode 16	Piotr Szkopiak	Hilary Frankland	21 December 2019	5.25
1156	17	Episode 17	Jordan Hogg	Dana Fainaru	28 December 2019	N/A (<6.00)
1157	18	Episode 18	Jordan Hogg	Debbie Owen	4 January 2020	N/A (<5.60)
1158	19	Episode 19	Roberto Bangura	Jillian Mannion	11 January 2020	N/A (<5.24)
1159	20	Episode 20	Roberto Bangura	Rachel Paterson	18 January 2020	4.95
1160	21	Episode 21	Eric Styles	Philip Lawrence	25 January 2020	N/A (<4.80)
1161	22	Episode 22	Eric Styles	Katie Douglas	1 February 2020	5.67
1162	23	Episode 23	Diana Patrick	Oliver Frampton	8 February 2020	5.21
1163	24	Episode 24	Diana Patrick	Dan Berlinka	15 February 2020	N/A (<4.85)
1164	25	Episode 25	Steve Hughes	Johanne McAndrew, Elliot Hope and Dana Fainaru	22 February 2020	4.62
1165	26	Episode 26	Steve Hughes	Adam Hughes	29 February 2020	4.72
1166	27	Episode 27	Andy Newbery	Colin Bytheway	7 March 2020	4.74
1167	28	Episode 28	Andy Newbery	Stephen McAteer	14 March 2020 (Note: The broadcast of this episode was brought forward from 21 March 2020 to 14 March 2020, due to the cancellation of a Six Nations Championship game.)	N/A (<4.61)
1168	29	Episode 29	Julie Edwards	Hilary Frankland	28 March 2020	N/A (<6.43)
1169	30	Episode 30	Emma Wilkinson	Hilary Frankland and David Semple	4 April 2020	N/A (<5.72)
1170	31	Episode 31	Roberto Bangura	Michelle Lipton	18 April 2020	N/A (<5.44)
1171	32	Episode 32	Roberto Bangura	Jeff Povey and Stephen McActeer	25 April 2020	N/A (<4.83)
1172	33	Episode 33	John Maidens	Rebecca Wojciechowski	2 May 2020	N/A (<5.22)
1173	34	Episode 34	Alex Jacob	Rachel Aird	23 May 2020	N/A (<4.35)
1174	35	Episode 35	Alex Jacob	Dana Fainaru	30 May 2020	N/A (<4.62)
1175	36	Episode 36	John Maidens	Charlie Swinbourne and Sophie Woolley	11 July 2020	4.21
1176	37	Episode 37	Michael Lacey	Jillian Mannion and Dana Fainaru	18 July 2020	4.63
1177	38	Episode 38	Michael Lacey	Tim Stimpson	25 July 2020	4.24
1178	39	Episode 39	Paul Riordan	Philip Lawrence	1 August 2020	4.49
1179	40	Episode 40	Paul Riordan	Debbie Owen	8 August 2020	4.09
1180	41	Episode 41	Ruth Carney	Katie Douglas	15 August 2020	4.16
1181	42	Episode 42	Katherine Churcher	Hamish Wright	22 August 2020	4.33
1182	43	"Code Orange"	Steve Hughes	Simon Norman	26 September 2020	N/A (<4.39)

=== Specials ===
No.	Title	Type of special	Directed by	Written by	Original release date
1	"The Parting of the Ways"	Webisode	Simon Meyers	David Roden	31 October 2009
2	"Children in Need special"	Charity	N/A	N/A	20 November 2009
3	"EastEnders 25th Anniversary"	Other	N/A	N/A	19 February 2010
4	"Blue Peter special"	Other	N/A	N/A	10 March 2010
5	"Short Story – Part One"	Webisode	Reza Moradi	Mark Catley	12 March 2011
6	"Short Story – Part Two"	Webisode	Reza Moradi	Mark Catley	2 April 2011
7	"Under Fire"	Webisode	Gareth Bryn	Catrin Clarke	12 April 2012
8	"The Kids Aren't Alright"	Webisode	Anne Edyvean	Matt Redd	21 July 2012
9	"Mistletoe and Rum"	Webisode	Sunetra Sarker	David P. Davis	15 December 2012
10	"Nurse Factor"	Webisode	Simon Norman	Janine H. Jones	28 December 2012
11	"Gone in Sixty Seconds"	Webisode	Jon Sen	Paul Quiney	5 January 2013
12	"Scars and Nightmares"	Webisode	Dafydd Palfrey	Asher Pirie	2 November 2013
13	"The Spirit of Christmas"	Webisode	Seán Gleeson	Henrietta Hardy	14 December 2013
14	"Radio Holby − Part One"	Webisode	Kodjo Tsakpo	Simon Norman	18 October 2014
15	"Radio Holby − Part Two"	Webisode	Kodjo Tsakpo	Ross Southard	25 October 2014
16	"Mrs Walker-To-Be"	Webisode	John Quarrell	Sarah Beeson	22 August 2015
17	"On Call"	Webisode	Jack Ryder	Kayleigh Llewellyn	10 October 2015
18	"Back to Ours"	Other	Matt Taylor	N/A	20 August 2016
19	"The First Noel"	Webisode	Anthony Sutcliffe	N/A	24 December 2016
20	"Our Holby City"	Other	Anthony Sutcliffe	N/A	29 March 2022

== See also ==
- Lists of Casualty episodes
