= Casualty series 26 =

Twenty-sixth series of Casualty

Casualty
- Series 26
- Starring: Matt Bardock; William Beck; Oliver Coleman; Charles Dale; Michael French; Jane Hazlegrove; Madeleine Mantock; Tony Marshall; Steven Miller; Michael Obiora; Suzanne Packer; Charlotte Salt; Sunetra Sarker; Georgia Taylor; Derek Thompson; Christine Tremarco; Ben Turner; Alex Walkinshaw
- No. of episodes: 42

Release
- Original network: BBC One; BBC One HD (from episode 17)
- Original release: 13 August 2011 – 22 July 2012

Series chronology
- ← Previous; Series 25 Next → Series 27

The twenty-sixth series of the British medical drama television series Casualty commenced airing in the United Kingdom on BBC One on 13 August 2011, one week after the end of the previous series and finished on 22 July 2012.

It is the first series in the history of the show to begin without a break from the previous series and the first to begin in August rather than the traditional September launch. This series featured forty-two episodes, which was five episodes less than the previous series. Series twenty-six was the first series to broadcast in high definition, with the first high definition episode broadcast from episode 17. The episode also saw the first episode to be filmed at the new set in Cardiff. The show saw its twenty-fifth anniversary in September 2011 and in March 2012, the show aired their first ever three-part story which centred on gang violence. The series concluded with a two-part riot storyline, entitled '#HolbyRiot', which aired on 21 and 22 July 2012. The series was originally planned to finish on 21 July, but due to a postponed episode on 30 June, the finale was moved to the following day.

This series welcomed Lloyd Asike (Michael Obiora), Adrian "Fletch" Fletcher (Alex Walkinshaw), Tom Kent (Oliver Coleman), Sam Nicholls (Charlotte Salt), and Scarlett Conway (Madeleine Mantock) – the last of whom left at the end of the series. The series also saw the departures of Ruth Winters (Georgia Taylor), Jay Faldren (Ben Turner) and Lenny Lyons (Steven Miller); and marked the first of three guest stints for Tamzin Bayle (Gemma Atkinson).

== Production ==
Oliver Kent continued as Series Producer until Episode 14. From Episode 15, Nikki Wilson has taken over.

== Cast ==
=== Overview ===
Most of the cast from series 25 carried over to the new series. These were senior charge nurse Charlie Fairhead, played by Derek Thompson, consultants Nick Jordan, Zoe Hanna and Dylan Keogh (Michael French, Sunetra Sarker and William Beck), trust grade doctor Ruth Winters (Georgia Taylor), Core Training 2 doctor Lenny Lyons (Steven Miller), clinical nurse manager Tess Bateman (Suzanne Packer), staff nurses Jay Faldren and Linda Andrews (Ben Turner and Christine Tremarco), paramedics Kathleen "Dixie" Dixon and Jeff Collier (Jane Hazlegrove and Matt Bardock), porter Mackenzie "Big Mac" Chalker (Charles Dale) and receptionist Noel Garcia (Tony Marshall).

Series 26 saw the brief addition to the cast of Gemma Atkinson (formerly Lisa Hunter in Hollyoaks) and Dhaffer L'Abidine (previously Marcel Sabatier in Dream Team). as paramedics Tamzin Bayle and Omar Nasri; their characters were written out early in the series, but Atkinson made two further brief returns, one in series 27 and one that stretched from late series 28 until early series 29.

Michael Obiora and Madeleine Mantock joined the cast as newly qualified staff nurses Lloyd Asike and Scarlett Conway. Later in the series, Charlotte Salt joined the cast as Dr Sam Nicholls, an army medic who was later revealed to be married to consultant Dylan Keogh. Oliver Coleman joined the cast on 7 January 2012, the first episode filmed in Cardiff, playing paediatric specialty doctor Tom Kent. New staff nurse Adrian "Fletch" Fletcher (Alex Walkinshaw) joined the show on 7 July 2012.

=== Main characters ===
- Matt Bardock as Jeff Collier
- William Beck as Dylan Keogh
- Oliver Coleman as Tom Kent (from episode 17)
- Charles Dale as Big Mac
- Michael French as Nick Jordan (until episode 42)
- Jane Hazlegrove as Kathleen "Dixie" Dixon
- Madeleine Mantock as Scarlett Conway (episodes 2−42)
- Tony Marshall as Noel Garcia
- Steven Miller as Lenny Lyons (until episode 38)
- Michael Obiora as Lloyd Asike (from episode 2)
- Suzanne Packer as Tess Bateman
- Charlotte Salt as Sam Nicholls (from episode 9)
- Sunetra Sarker as Zoe Hanna
- Georgia Taylor as Ruth Winters (until episode 16)
- Derek Thompson as Charlie Fairhead
- Christine Tremarco as Linda Andrews
- Ben Turner as Jay Faldren (until episode 16)
- Alex Walkinshaw as Adrian "Fletch" Fletcher (from episode 39)

=== Recurring characters ===
- Devon Beigan as Britney Andrews (from episode 19)
- Kate McEvoy as Denise Andrews
- Taylor Parry as Joe Andrews (from episode 19)
- Rachel Shelley as Yvonne Rippon (from episode 18)

=== Guest characters ===
- Gemma Atkinson as Tamzin Bayle (episodes 1−7)
- Danny Dyer as Rossy (episode 23)
- Dhaffer L'Abidine as Omar Nasri (episodes 1−7)
- Marshall Lancaster as Keith Parr (episodes 17−33)
- Azuka Oforka as Louise Tilney (episodes 7−12)
- Michael Stevenson as Iain Dean (episode 33)

== Episodes ==
| No. overall | No. in series | Title | Directed by | Written by | Original release date | UK viewers (millions) |
|---|---|---|---|---|---|---|
| 782 | 1 | "Partners" | Declan O'Dwyer | Mark Catley | 13 August 2011 | 6.48 |
Dixie (Jane Hazlegrove) and Jeff (Matt Bardock) face new competition in the form of new paramedics Omar Nasri (Dhaffer L'Abidine) and Tamzin Bayle (Gemma Atkinson) and just when they think their day couldn't get any worse, they are called to a farmhouse and are met by a drugs baron and a pack of wild dogs. Jordan (Michael French) begins to panic that the symptoms of his previous tumour are returning. First appearances: Omar Nasri (Dhaffer L'Abidine) and Tamzin Bayle (Gemma Atkinson) Guest appearances: Eva Pope and Paul Barber
| 783 | 2 | "Starting Out" | Declan O'Dwyer | Tim Baker | 20 August 2011 | 5.13 |
Charlie (Derek Thompson) welcomes two new nurses Lloyd Asike (Michael Obiora) and Scarlett Conway (Madeleine Mantock) and whilst Lloyd gets off to a good start, Scarlett is more interested in the hospital's anaesthetist George Murphy rather than the patients. A teaching assistant (Lee Mead) gets beaten up in a fight between a senior colleague and a problematic student. First appearances: Lloyd Asike (Michael Obiora) and Scarlett Conway (Madeleine Mantock) Guest appearance: Lee Mead
| 784 | 3 | "Common Vector" | Simon Massey | Steve Bailie | 27 August 2011 | 5.19 |
Several patients are brought into the department suffering from strange but similar symptoms and their condition continues to deteriorate, Dylan (William Beck) faces a race against time to find the common link. Lloyd and Scarlett struggle with the demands of their duties. Linda (Christine Tremarco) is attacked by two drug addicts. Guest appearances: Naomi Bentley, Tina O'Brien & Gaynor Faye
| 785 | 4 | "Memory Games" | Simon Massey | Frank Rickarby | 3 September 2011 | 4.82 |
Lloyd's refusal to break his moral code and lie to a patient leads to him clashing with Jay (Ben Turner) and then confiding in Tess (Suzanne Packer) about his grievances. A patient mistakenly believes she is being stalked. Zoe (Sunetra Sarker) discovers that Dylan helps out the paramedics at accidents scenes on a voluntary basis. Guest appearance: Emma Samms
| 786 | 5 | "To Have and Have Not" | Declan Eames | Rachel Flowerday | 17 September 2011 | 5.40 |
Young Jesse has fallen from a rope ladder and keeps blacking out. Ruth (Georgia Taylor) and Jay treat him but as his condition worsens, he needs urgent surgery to relieve the pressure in his brain. At the end of the shift, Ruth is grateful for Jay's support during the day. Her gesture of thanks seems to rekindle tenderness between them. Meanwhile, in CDU, Lloyd is responsible for observing the injured Seb, a cantankerous old man who's desperate to get home to his wife. Seb slips away and Lloyd races after him, making a horrifying discovery at his house. But Seb's life is at risk and Lloyd is desperate to save him.
| 787 | 6 | "Fixed" | Declan Eames | Matthew Broughton | 24 September 2011 | 4.72 |
A drug addict relapses leading to the future of Charlie's clinic being put on the line when a drug dealer turns up at the department. Jordan's "complacency" drive ends with Zoe getting an unexpected promotion. The re-appearance of an estranged brother at a funeral ends in a brawl and a shocking revelation. Guest appearance: Christopher Ellison
| 788 | 7 | "Wild Horses" | Steve Brett | Paul Matthew Thompson | 1 October 2011 | 5.27 |
As a drug addict recovers from a beating, Linda blames Jordan for closing the drugs clinic which would have kept her safe and has to choice between breaking the law and saving the drug addict. Jeff and Omar clash over Omar's believe that targets should be put before the patient. Final appearances: Omar Nasri (Dhaffer L'Abidine) & Tamzin Bayle (Gemma Atkinson)
| 789 | 8 | "Charlie's Angels" | Steve Brett | David Bowker | 8 October 2011 | 5.16 |
During a traffic jam, Charlie discovers that a girl has fainted on a road bridge and has fallen into his car and the girl claims that he is the saviour of the earth. Zoe takes up the case and has to act quickly when she faints again. Scarlett doubts her abilities when she has the shift from hell. The full script for the episode can be read on the BBC website.
| 790 | 9 | "Mea Culpa" | Tim Leandro | Stephen McAteer | 15 October 2011 | 5.45 |
Sam Nicholls (Charlotte Salt) an army medic joins the team on a secondment and begins by joining the paramedics for the day and has to act quickly when the ambulance is forced off the road. Noel (Tony Marshall) wants to increase security around the hospital but a confrontation with a grieving mother soon changes his mind. First appearance: Sam Nicholls (Charlotte Salt) Guest appearances: Angela Lonsdale, Tracie Bennett, Ray Emmet Brown & George Costigan
| 791 | 10 | "Sanctuary" | Tim Leandro | Tahsin Güner | 22 October 2011 | 5.23 |
Linda sticks her neck out to help a heroin addict and her baby daughter escape her violent pimp but she ends up risking Tess' wrath in the process. Zoe is highly amused when she discovers that Dylan and Sam have a history, especially when she mocks his attempts to be the Sherlock Holmes of the medical world. Guest appearance: Vicky Binns
| 792 | 11 | "Pound of Flesh" | Richard Signy | Sasha Hails | 29 October 2011 | 5.29 |
Jeff and Dixie accuse a patient of using their ambulance as a taxi service but they are forced to eat humble pie when Lloyd investigates further about the patient. When a 16-year-old is released from prison, a revenge attack causes a hospital volunteer to be stabbed. Lenny (Steven Miller) receives some upsetting news from an old love.
| 793 | 12 | "Natural Selection" | Richard Signy | Paul Coates | 5 November 2011 | 5.02 |
Dixie's feud with an ambulance controller has tragic consequences when victims of a shooting are brought into the ED. Dylan tries to help a frightened young girl but it is clear that he has met her "mother" before who has taken a dislike to him.
| 794 | 13 | "No Goodbyes" | Simon Meyers | Kelly Jones | 19 November 2011 | 4.93 |
Sam helps a teenage mother come to terms with the fact that she isn't a bad mother. Ruth helps an elderly couple come to terms with a terminal illness. Ruth confides in Jordan that she is feeling weepy and distracted but she then makes a surprising discovery. Guest appearances: Susan Hampshire & Michael Jayston
| 795 | 14 | "The Ties That Bind" (Note: See also "The Ties That Bind" series 7, "The Ties That Bind" series 13, "The Ties That Bind" series 17 & "The Ties That Bind Us" series 19) | Simon Meyers | Frank Rickarby | 26 November 2011 | 5.22 |
Ruth's condition forces her to rethink her mental health medication but she is furious when both Jay and Jordan interfere. Dixie is depressed following the multiple shooting and ends risking her life by running into a burning shed and burns her arms in the process.
| 796 | 15 | "Next of Kin – Part One" | Simon Massey | Patrick Homes | 3 December 2011 | 5.01 |
Ruth and Jay's relationship seems stronger than ever until Ruth suffers a major wobble. Linda's enemy returns and plans to kidnap his baby daughter. As Jordan tries to address some fire hazards, a socket outlet overloads for the last time and soon the fire alarms begin sounding. Guest appearance: Sean Blowers
| 797 | 16 | "Next of Kin – Part Two" | Simon Massey | Sally Abbott | 10 December 2011 | 5.31 |
Lenny and the fire officer alert everyone to a fire in the basement of the building and Jordan orders an evacuation. Jay confronts Ruth over why she dumped him but soon they have bigger problems when the fire traps them in an office and as an explosion leaves Zoe and Dylan trapped in resus, will any of them make it out of the building alive? Final appearances: Jay Faldren (Ben Turner) & Ruth Winters (Georgia Taylor) Note:Last episode filmed in Bristol
| 798 | 17 | "Duty of Care" (Note: See also "Duty of Care" series 9 & "Duty of Care" series 25) | Reza Moradi | Paul Logue | 7 January 2012 | 6.99 |
The ED reopens to minor cases following the fire but the team are forced to change their plans when a traffic incident on the dual carriageway brings casualties flooding into Holby. The situation worsens when a related traffic incident causes a gas pipe to explode and poisonous gas engulfs the town. Despite the efforts of new paediatric doctor Tom, (Oliver Coleman) the ED is at full stretch. Will the ED team cope with one of their most challenging days yet? Note: First episode filmed from Cardiff, and shown in HD. First appearance: Tom Kent (Oliver Coleman)
| 799 | 18 | "Death & Doughnuts" | Simon Meyers | Steve Bailie | 14 January 2012 | 6.81 |
Following his heroics during the explosion the previous day, Tom formally joins the team at the ED and his first case soon turns into a mystery when a family caught up in the explosion return to the ED with mysterious injuries. Big Mac (Charles Dale) turns into an unlikely hero when a young son from the family is then kidnapped. Dylan accuses Sam of meddling with a patient's home life but will it turn out to be for the better? Jordan's feathers are ruffled by a young attractive DCI. First appearance: DCI Yvonne Rippon (Rachel Shelley)
| 800 | 19 | "Trust" | Declan O'Dwyer | Rachel Flowerday | 21 January 2012 | 6.61 |
When a woman is rushed into the hospital with broken ribs and no memory of what took place, Lloyd insists that they investigate but has he unwittingly sent her back into the dangerous situation she was trying to escape from in the first place? Linda is horrified when her sister Denise and her children turn up at the ED and even more shocked when she finds out her sister is still a drug addict. First appearances: Britney Andrews (Devon Beigan) & Joe Andrews (Taylor Parry) Guest appearance: Denise Andrews (Kate McEvoy)
| 801 | 20 | "Hero Syndrome" | Declan O'Dwyer | Nicola Wilson | 28 January 2012 | 6.24 |
Linda is forced to bring her sister's children into work and they end up causing chaos when they try to abduct a baby just to get back at Linda and just when Linda's day couldn't get any worse, she then finds out that Denise has been arrested and that the children may be taken into care. Dylan deals with a homeless alcoholic who gives him a run for his money.
| 802 | 21 | "The Only One You Love" | Jon Sen | Marston Bloom | 4 February 2012 | 6.68 |
Linda takes on her sister's children after their mum was arrested. A woman learns she cannot cope with the challenges of looking after her beloved mother, who has Alzheimer's.
| 803 | 22 | "Confidences" | Jon Sen | Tony McHale | 11 February 2012 | 6.36 |
Sam throws herself into treating a patient she believes has been sexually assaulted as a way of distancing herself from her own problems with Keith Parr, much to the worry of Zoe and Dylan.
| 804 | 23 | "Love Is" | Nigel Douglas | Paul Logue | 18 February 2012 | 6.35 |
There's a new paramedic in Holby. "Rossy" (Danny Dyer) works alone and is responding to all the shouts faster than Jeff and Dixie. He seems too good to be true, and soon Dixie finds out he might be just that. Meanwhile, 30-year-old Tara is getting ready for a special meal with her boyfriend. She thinks he may ask to make their relationship a little more formal. But younger sister Gemma is less than thrilled about the idea of them getting married.
| 805 | 24 | "Grand Canyon" | Nigel Douglas | Dana Fainaru | 25 February 2012 | 6.10 |
Sam is told to keep her head down by Jordan after a formal complaint is made to the GMC, and Linda is distressed when Britney runs away from her foster home; will this make her rethink her decision to give up the children?
| 806 | 25 | "Ricochet: How to Save a Life" | Richard Platt | David Bowker | 3 March 2012 | 6.04 |
16-year-old Stevie is drawn into the Farmead Crew. Forced to prove his loyalty to the gang, he is persuaded by leader Anton to shoot at a rival drug dealer to warn him off their turf. But the shooting goes wrong and a small boy is caught in the crossfire. With Stevie violently punished by the gang for messing up, gang members spill into the ED, attracting the attention of Superintendent Yvonne Rippon. As Jordan and his team battle to save the young gun victim, Yvonne suspects gang-related violence and interrogates Stevie.
| 807 | 26 | "Ricochet: Damage Control" | Richard Platt | Andrea Page | 10 March 2012 | 6.08 |
The ED reaps the fallout from the shooting of Jacob Broker when gunman Stevie's girlfriend Jade is brought in, injured and raped as the result of a Farmead Crew attempt to ensure Stevie's silence.
| 808 | 27 | "Ricochet: What Goes Around Comes Around" | Richard Platt | Emma Goodwin | 17 March 2012 | 5.83 |
Tess and Jordan's decision not to tell the police the true nature of Jade's injuries leaves Yvonne furious and leads to more trouble in the ED when yet more violence breaks out. Can the staff restore order before things spiral out of control?
| 809 | 28 | "Lest Ye Be Judged" | Steve Hughes | Chris Ould | 24 March 2012 | 5.55 |
Sam throws herself into helping an old soldier and his son in an effort to distract herself from the GMC interviews. Meanwhile, Linda moonlights at a private clinic to earn extra money, but her exhaustion leads to potentially dangerous mistakes.
| 810 | 29 | "Saturday Night Fever" | Declan O'Dwyer | Sasha Hails | 31 March 2012 | 5.66 |
Jordan's date with Yvonne Rippon is put on hold when a patient collapses in prison after being arrested for assaulting Lloyd. The incident threatens the pair's blossoming relationship as it becomes apparent one of them may be held accountable for the unwell man being left in a cell. Meanwhile, Linda and Zoe enjoy a girls' night out, but are quickly sobered by an encounter with a teenager in need of help. While attending an emergency, a woman plants an unwanted baby in Dixie and Jeff's ambulance.
| 811 | 30 | "When the Gloves Come Off" | Declan O'Dwyer | Stephen McAteer | 7 April 2012 | 5.63 |
Sam braves her fear of the dark to treat patients trapped in a cave system, but it soon becomes apparent that both are seriously injured and she needs support. Help arrives in the form of Dylan, but the couple start bickering about cowardice in their marriage. As both patients' conditions deteriorate, can Sam and Dylan put aside their differences to save them? Meanwhile, with Linda bracing herself for family court, niece Britney comes into the ED and tries to get her into trouble by stealing from a patient. Can Zoe make Britney see that living with Linda might not be such a bad option?
| 812 | 31 | "Fools for Love" | Richard Signy | Fiona Peek | 14 April 2012 | 5.84 |
Teenager Alicia is back in the ED after collapsing at school, and Tom is determined to get to the bottom of her symptoms. Linda believes that Alicia's problems are psychological and that she's developed an unhealthy fixation on Tom. Meanwhile, long-suffering Rosemary takes action on her nuisance neighbours by setting her house on fire, but is shocked to wake up at the ED to find that her neighbour's son Connor has rescued her. Lloyd and Scarlett disagree when Lloyd flares up after receiving a racist insult.
| 813 | 32 | "Desperate Remedies" | Richard Signy | Frank Rickarby | 21 April 2012 | 5.61 |
It's the week before Sam's GMC hearing and the tension is starting to show, especially when Zoe reveals that she's been called to testify against Sam. Sam takes her frustration out on Scarlett – much to Lloyd's annoyance, who is determined to get Scarlett to discuss their relationship. Meanwhile, a chance remark from Dylan about work relationships causes Lenny to look at Linda in a new light and he attempts to kiss her.
| 814 | 33 | "Appropriate Force" | Paul Murphy | Steve Bailie | 28 April 2012 | 5.50 |
The day of Sam's GMC hearing arrives and she is shocked when an old army colleague is called to give evidence against her. But when she then sacks her defence team and is then confronted by damning evidence from Jordan, Scarlett and Dylan, things do not look like going her way but when Keith then collapses during the hearing, Zoe makes a revelation which could change the entire investigation—will she make it to the hearing in time?
| 815 | 34 | "Happily Ever After" | Paul Murphy | Peter McKenna | 5 May 2012 | 5.06 |
Dixie and Jeff rush 9-year-old Luke into the ED with a suspected head injury. When he dies, Dixie is convinced that there are suspicious circumstances and calls the police. Jeff is furious as he knows the boy's father and is convinced that he had nothing to do with his son's death. Yvonne and D.I. Cook come to investigate the matter at the ED. Meanwhile, Dylan thinks that Sam wants to get back together with him and he books a table for them at a romantic restaurant. However, Zoe realises that Sam actually wants to serve him with divorce papers and she convinces Sam to finally tell Dylan the truth.
| 816 | 35 | "Home Truths" | Ashley Way | Julian Perkins | 12 May 2012 | 4.37 |
Dylan is finding it impossible to work alongside Sam. Forced to liaise over a disabled patient and his over-protective daughter, Dylan and Sam come to an uneasy truce to get to the bottom of the case. But the tension proves too much for Sam and she makes an impulsive decision. Meanwhile, Lloyd is becoming increasingly possessive of Scarlett, irritating her and affecting his work. Tired of the bickering, Lloyd asks Scarlett if they can come 'out' and announce their relationship to their colleagues. Elsewhere, it's decision time for Lenny when he receives a tempting job offer from London.
| 817 | 36 | "Teenage Dreams" | Ashley Way | Matthew Barry | 19 May 2012 | 5.00 |
When a high school roof collapses, Tom is reunited with a troubled teenage girl whom he has previously recommended for counselling. But the girl's jealous boyfriend claims she doesn't want Tom treating her, so Jordan pulls him off the case for his own safety. Meanwhile, Linda thinks that she's making progress with Joe and Britney and they're starting to behave like a real family, until a furious Britney delivers a mighty blow.
| 818 | 37 | "All in a Day's Nightmare – Part One" | Jon Sen | Tony McHale | 2 June 2012 | 5.60 |
Father-of-two Clive is brought into the ED with serious injuries, but he lies to his family about how he received them. The mystery deepens when a strange woman claiming to be Clive's wife arrives at his bedside. Despite the presence of bickering police officers Chris and Preeya, it's left to the more experienced Charlie to work out that Clive is being harassed by loan sharks. Meanwhile, Linda is forced to bring a suspended Britney into work with her, but the teenager defies Linda's ban on using the ED wifi and wheedles the password out of Lenny. When Lenny discovers that she has arranged to meet someone she's been talking to in a chatroom, he chases her out of the ED. Panicked, Britney gets in a car with the stranger. Elsewhere, Scarlett's first meeting with Lloyd's family doesn't go according to plan when she turns down his mum's specially prepared dinner.
| 819 | 38 | "All in a Day's Nightmare – Part Two" | Jon Sen | Tony McHale | 8 June 2012 | 5.64 |
In the second episode of this two-parter, Linda's niece Britney faces serious danger from an internet predator, while on Lenny's last day in Holby, his medical skills are put to the test. Britney has arranged to meet someone she met chatting online, but the man is not 19 years old as he claimed to be. When the man takes Britney back to his flat, she soon finds herself in an extremely threatening situation. Can Lenny and Linda track her down in time?. Meanwhile, the Chilcot family are back in the ED after a fight breaks out in a nightclub and eldest son Matthew collapses. Dylan diagnoses that Matthew is a sickle cell sufferer and that he will urgently need a bone marrow transplant. What more family secrets will be revealed as they search for a perfect tissue match?. Elsewhere, Scarlett and Lloyd fall out over her treatment of his family, and the team bids farewell to a prickly but popular colleague. Final appearance: Lenny Lyons (Steven Miller)
| 820 | 39 | "Zero Sum Game" | Graeme Harper | Kelly Jones | 7 July 2012 | 4.92 |
Sam has high hopes of returning to Afghanistan, but when she falters during a training exercise, she is forced to question whether she will ever be ready to face a war zone again. On her way home she comes across Captain Morrison, a former army colleague, who is slumped in a crashed vehicle. Suspecting that he has had an epileptic fit, she is torn over whether she should tell the army the truth of her suspicions, which could end his military career. Meanwhile, new nurse Fletch (played by Alex Walkinshaw) joins the ED team. He makes a favourable impression with everyone – except for Lloyd. The pair are forced to work together to help Amy, whose initial joy at discovering she is pregnant turns to horror when the true diagnosis is made. First appearance: Adrian "Fletch" Fletcher (Alex Walkinshaw) Note: This episode was originally due to air on 30 June, but was rescheduled due to extended coverage of the 2012 Wimbledon Championships. Despite this, the episode was temporarily available (in HD only) on BBC iPlayer from 30 June.
| 821 | 40 | "Do the Right Thing" | Graeme Harper | Emma Goodwin | 14 July 2012 | 5.35 |
Newly released from prison and determined to turn his life around, Wesley is devastated to discover that his wife Faith still dealing drugs. When police are alerted to a violent argument at Wesley's home they come prepared for trouble and end up using a stun gun on Wesley, not realizing that Faith has already given him a blow to the head. When Wesley suffers serious complications in the ED, Jordan and the team question the police involvement, straining relations between Jordan and his police officer partner Yvonne.Dylan and Sam are still at loggerheads, with Dylan refusing to sign the divorce papers if Sam persists in her plan to stay at Holby. Tensions reach a dangerous pitch and almost threaten the survival of a teenager, who is implicated in the persecution of a vulnerable man living on the estate.
| 822 | 41 | "#HolbyRiot – Part One" | Reza Moradi | Sally Abbott | 21 July 2012 | 5.21 |
In the first of a two-part series finale, Jordan and Yvonne are called to give evidence about Wesley Royce, the man who died in the ED after being Tasered by police, and end up arguing when she claims he is refusing to support her case. Scarlett accompanies Lloyd to a vigil for the dead man, and when what should be a peaceful ceremony descends into violence, she finds herself swept up in the moment and does something she could live to regret.Jeff and Dixie are also caught up in the violence when they try to treat a young mother who is suffering from anaphylactic shock. As the baying crowd try to stop the ambulance getting through, Jeff and Dixie have to use all their experience to get the dying Amber to ED.
| 823 | 42 | "#HolbyRiot – Part Two" | Reza Moradi | Sasha Hails | 22 July 2012 | 5.13 |
In the Concluding episode to both this tense two-parter and the series, A vigil for Wesley Royce blows up into a full-scale riot, and Scarlett is swept along with the rioters. In a face-off with the police she finds herself on the wrong side of the law. Unsure of which way to turn, she is pressured into helping a severely injured rioter. Picking up the pieces, Lloyd comes to the horrible realization that he really doesn’t know his girlfriend. Dixie and Jeff are dispatched to pick up the gravely injured Yvonne, after she was stabbed by a panicked shopkeeper, who mistook her for a rioter. She appears to have sustained a really bad stab wound and critical head and spinal injury after she fell down the stairs when she was stabbed. They realize she needs immediate critical care and request a doctor. Jordan goes, but can he keep his emotions in check and do the job? In the ambulance on the way to ED, Yvonne stops breathing. Jordan is forced to perform a dangerous life saving operation in the ambulance, as the riots block their way. Final appearance: Scarlett Conway (Madeleine Mantock) The full script for the episode can be read on the BBC website.
