= Next of Kin (Casualty) =

- Casualty episodes
- Episode nos.: Series 26; Episodes 15–16
- Directed by: Simon Massey
- Written by: Patrick Homes (Part 1); Sally Abbott (Part 2)
- Original air dates: 3 December 2011 (Part 1); 10 December 2011 (Part 2)
- Running time: 49 minutes

Guest appearances
- Paul Sharma as Damon Lynch; Eleanor Rowe as Lily Stone; Josephine Lloyd-Welcome as Alice Lynch; Sean Blowers as Frank Malloy; Robert Cheung as Jake Coulson; Emma Stansfield as Sarah Owen; Paul Oldham as Bin Head; Sam Redford as Richard Stone; Mark Powley as Lance Croom; Alan Rothwell as Bernard Jones; Anne Rutter as Susan Jones

Episode chronology
← Previous "The Ties that Bind"	Next → "Duty of Care"
- Casualty series 26

"Next of Kin" is a two-part episode of the British medical drama Casualty that served as the 15th and 16th episodes of the show's twenty-sixth series, and the 796th and 797th episodes overall. The first part premiered on 3 December 2011, and the second on 10 December 2011 on BBC One and BBC One HD in the United Kingdom. Both parts were directed by Simon Massey; part one was written by Patrick Homes and part two by Sally Abbott. "Next of Kin" marks Casualty's final episode to be filmed at their Bristol studios, where the show has been filmed since its conception in 1986, after the BBC decided to move the show to a new studio in Cardiff as part of their plans to expand production outside of England. The move received much opposition from multiple sources, including the cast and parliament.

The plot sees the show's setting, an emergency department, engulfed in a fire, a stunt designed to mark the final episode from Bristol. It also features the exits of regular characters Ruth Winters (Georgia Taylor) and Jay Faldren (Ben Turner); writers wanted to challenge the characters a final time before leaving through a pregnancy story. "Next of Kin" also served to progress other character stories. Filming took place in August 2011 at both the show's studios and The Bottle Yard Studios, where a replica set was created for the fire stunt. The final scene was filmed on the Clifton Suspension Bridge, mirroring a scene from the show's first ever episode.

The show's production team worked with companies The Giggle Group and MTFX Ltd across the development of the episode. Elements of the episode were filmed and edited using computer-generated imagery (CGI) so that fire could be inputted into scenes, making it appear realistic. Massey admitted that the production team encountered multiple logistical problems with the fire scenes, in particular in a tracking shot of the ED. Stunt performers were hired for the episode and used in scenes where two characters were thrown backwards by a backdraft explosion, and where a character was thrown through a glass sign.

The episode marked the first time Casualty had filmed and aired in high-definition television (HDTV). It was promoted through three trailers and a documentary released on the show's official website. The episode rated well with 5.01 and 5.31 million viewers watching the two parts within 7 days of their original broadcast. It was also well received by television critics, who praised the drama of the fire stunt and Ruth and Jay's exit from the show.

== Plot ==
=== Part one ===
At Holby City Hospital's emergency department (ED), nurses Lloyd Asike (Michael Obiora) and Scarlett Conway (Madeleine Mantock) complete a competency assessment. Elsewhere, Jay Faldren (Ben Turner) and Ruth Winters (Georgia Taylor) attend an ultrasound appointment. At work, they individually discuss the pregnancy with their respective bosses, Charlie Fairhead (Derek Thompson) and Nick Jordan (Michael French); Ruth is annoyed Jay told Charlie. Fire safety officer Frank Malloy (Sean Blowers) warns Noel Garcia (Tony Marshall), Big Mac (Charles Dale), and Lenny Lyons (Steven Miller) that a snug they are creating in the basement is a fire hazard. At a youth centre, Lily Stone (Eleanor Rowe) shows her friend Jake Coulson (Robert Cheung) her lighter and explains her mother died in a fire. Later, Lily lets off a smoke bomb, giving Jake an asthma attack. Lily accompanies him to ED and stays with Frank, her grandfather. She finds a report about her mother's death, which she burns outside. Frank stops the fire and they argue. Jake suffers an allergic reaction to the potassium nitrate in the smoke bombs, but recovers.

Pimp Damon Lynch (Paul Sharma) watches Sarah Owen (Emma Stansfield) and her foster child, Evelyn, from afar and punctures her car tyres. While driving them home, Evelyn suffers a nosebleed. She is admitted to ED, where nurse Linda Andrews (Christine Tremarco) recognises Damon from protecting Evelyn's mother, Annie Mclean (Naomi Bentley), from him. He confronts Linda, revealing Annie is alive, despite Linda's previous claims. Later, Sarah tells Damon she is considering adopting Evelyn. When Nick asks about Evelyn's father, Linda reveals it is Damon, who then admits to following Sarah. Damon's terminally ill mother, Alice Lynch (Josephine Lloyd-Welcome), is admitted. She threatens Damon and tells Ruth that Damon hit her and caused his father's death. Damon tells Linda his father died of suicide when he was young, before confronting Alice, who belittles him. Ruth diagnoses Evelyn with haemophilia.

Lily gives Alice her lighter and cigarettes; she has one and dies. Damon starts a small fire in her room, which Frank extinguishes. He finds Lily's lighter. Paramedics Dixie Dixon (Jane Hazlegrove) and Jeff Collier (Matt Bardock) tell Ruth that Alice slipped at home. Damon tries taking Evelyn and when Linda stops him, he threatens her. She explains herself and he leaves, telling Ruth he is unworthy. She resonates and ends her relationship with Jay. Frank gives Big Mac a kettle for the snug, which sparks a fire. When another alarm goes off, Frank assumes it is a fault. He confronts Lily about the lighter; she cries in the bathroom. Lenny and Frank investigate the snug, but as Lenny opens the door, a backdraft is created and an explosion rips through the basement.

=== Part two ===
In the basement, Lenny extinguishes a fire on Frank; the fire alarm is off. In the ED, everyone returns inside after the alarm is deemed false. Drug addict Binhead (Paul Oldham) is admitted, faking having kidney stones, but Zoe challenges him. He robs the pharmacy, where Lily finds him; he steals her lighter and locks her in a cupboard. Ruth tells Nick she is going home, but goes to her office instead to avoid Jay. He follows her and confronts her. Lenny reaches the ED and announces the fire. The department is evacuated but consultants Dylan Keogh (William Beck) and Zoe Hanna (Sunetra Sarker) stay to treat Frank in Resus. Nick demands they leave once provision is erected outside. Scarlett returns inside to find missing patients Susan Jones (Anne Rutter) and Bernard Jones (Alan Rothwell). As she tries evacuating them, an explosion rips through the department, trapping Susan. They escape with firefighter Richard Stone's (Sam Redford) help.

As Jay realises the ED is empty, the fire alarm sounds. Ruth and Jay find Lily but are trapped by the fire, so exit towards the roof through the ventilation duct. Lily warns them the fire dampers will close soon. They reach the vertical shaft and Lily climbs to the top. Ruth calls Charlie and informs him they are inside, but drops her phone down the shaft. Jay calms her when she has a panic attack and when they reach the top, they realise they misdirected Lily. As Lily tries returning, a damper separates her from Ruth and Jay. The couple reach the roof and Ruth is distressed to lose Lily, who has escaped to a locked room. Elsewhere, Zoe and Dylan try moving Frank but an explosion forces them into Resus. After noticing the fire, Binhead reenters the ED. Fire officers try stopping him but an explosion sends him flying through glass. He runs outside on fire and tries telling someone about Lily. Richard, Lily's father, recognises her lighter and realises she is inside. They call and he instructs her to climb out the window, where Ruth and Jay find her.

Fire officers warn Charlie the building's structure is unstable. Zoe and Dylan drink gin and he prepares fentanyl so they can kill themselves if they cannot escape. Zoe rejects the idea and plays music. Outside, Noel contacts their next of kin and is surprised when doctor Sam Nicholls (Charlotte Salt) reveals she is Dylan's wife. Everyone is rescued from the fire. Dylan is annoyed Sam revealed their secret. Ruth and Jay reconcile and decide to leave Holby. They announce their pregnancy, before resigning. The next day, Nick and Charlie visit the burnt ED. At the Clifton Suspension Bridge, Ruth and Jay depart in their campervan.

== Production ==
=== Background ===
"Today's announcement places BBC Wales at the heart of BBC drama network production. We have already established a first-class drama production base in Wales and Casualty provides a springboard for further creative and talent development."

— BBC Cymru Wales Controller Menna Richards on the move to Cardiff (2009)

In October 2008, it was reported that Casualty could be relocated from its current production base in Bristol to a new filming studio in Cardiff. This was confirmed on 26 March 2009 as part of the BBC's mission to expand production across Wales, Scotland and Northern Ireland. Production was scheduled to move in 2011 after twenty-five years in Bristol. Menna Richards, the BBC Cymru Wales Controller, hoped that the move would create "a springboard for further creative and talent development". Piers Wenger, the head of drama at BBC Cymru Wales, reiterated this and added that Casualty is a key element to the expansion of BBC Cymru Wales. John Yorke, the BBC Controller of Drama Production and New Talent, opined that the move was "incredibly exciting" and would secure the show's future as "one of Saturday night's favourite dramas". In January 2011, it was confirmed that the new studio would be located at Roath Lock drama village.

The show's move faced opposition from multiple sources. Caroline Norbury, chief executive officer (CEO) at South Wales Screen, a Bristol organisation promoting film and television production in South West England, expressed plans to campaign for Casualty remaining in Bristol. Two members of the show's production crew - prop master Patrick Black and freelance producer David McHenry - expressed their dismay with the move to Robin Turner from Wales Online. Kerry McCarthy, the Member of Parliament (MP) for Bristol East, was critical of the news and likened it to moving soap opera EastEnders from Albert Square to Trafalgar Square. Derek Thompson, the serial's longest-serving cast member, disliked the decision to relocate the series and dubbed it a result of unexplained "BBC bureaucracy". He added that he would miss filming in Bristol. Johnathan Young, the show's executive producer, admitted that although there was "mixed feelings" about the move, viewers should not notice any differences. A campaign, named "Keep Casualty in Bristol", was launched by Equity to prevent the move, although chairman Terry Victor noted that sets in Bristol would likely need reconstructing anyway due to their age and the introduction of high-definition television (HDTV). Thompson was appreciative of the campaign's efforts and contributed to the street protests.

=== Development ===
"Next of Kin" is a celebration for both the show's twenty-fifth anniversary, which was reached in September 2011, and the final episodes filmed from Bristol. Consequently, producers decided to make the episode an event, wanting to leave Bristol "with a bang!" A story was devised, where the show's setting - the emergency department (ED) of the fictitious Holby City Hospital - was destroyed in a fire. Series producer Oliver Kent teased the episode in a promotional interview with Daniel Kilkelly of Digital Spy, calling it one of a collection of "big episodes" during the transition in studios. William Beck, who portrays Dylan Keogh, dubbed the events of the episode "a fitting end to our time in Bristol".

The episode is directed by Simon Massey, who expressed his "enormous pride" to have worked on it. In a behind-the-scenes video for the show, he commented, "I gave my heart and soul to this job for a number of months and it was absolutely fantastic." Patrick Homes wrote the first part of the episode and the second part was written by Sally Abbott. Abbott felt "lucky" to write the episode and speaking in 2014, she admitted that people talk to her about the episode weekly. Abbott sought the cast's opinion on the script and spoke to them on-set, before rewriting any agreed suggestions. Sunetra Sarker suggested that her character Zoe Hanna could play music from her phone when she is trapped in Resus and believes she will not escape, which Abbott then wrote into the script. "Next of Kin" was produced by Rebecca Hedderly. Casualty's production team worked in conjunction with The Giggle Group, a film and animation studio, from the conception stage of the episode. The company's managing director, Steve Garratt, discussed how to achieve the fire stunt with Massey and the show's writing team. These discussions included whether it would be possible to remain on the show's set.

The episode features the departures of Ruth Winters (Georgia Taylor) and Jay Faldren (Ben Turner), who have appeared in the drama since 2007 and 2008, respectively. Their departures were announced on 21 October 2011. A show spokesperson teased an "explosive and heart-stopping" final episode for the pair and added, "we don't think they'll be disappointed with the character's extremely dramatic exit later this year!" Taylor and Turner did not plan to leave together, but their decisions coincided so they were written out together. Taylor liked that their exit featured in the show's final episodes in Bristol, calling it "quite a fitting end". Ruth and Jay have been in an on-off relationship since the latter was introduced to the show, and writers have challenged them with multiple obstacles. Turner noted that they have "been on a bit of a roller coaster over the past couple of years".

For their final episodes, writers created a new challenge for the couple when Ruth becomes pregnant. The pair previously encountered this in series 24, but Ruth terminated the pregnancy behind Jay's back. Turner thought that this reduced the "excitement" Jay feels for this pregnancy. He added that Jay finds fatherhood "a scary prospect" as he is worried about Ruth. Likewise, Ruth is scared about the pregnancy and the effect her bipolar disorder may have, so she pushes Jay away and ends their relationship. Discussing Ruth's feelings, Taylor commented, "She just freaks out. Ruth has always felt she's not good enough for Jay". Jay is disappointed with Ruth's choice and decides to fight it. He then goes to her office and announces that they won't leave until it is sorted. During this time, a fire breaks out in the hospital. Turner and Taylor explained that Jay first realises that there is a fire and that the hospital has been evacuated, leaving Ruth and Jay "stranded" and unable to escape.

Writers introduced guest character Lily Stone, portrayed by Eleanor Rowe, into Ruth and Jay's escape story. Lily features across both parts of the episode with her own story. Ruth, Jay and Lily decide to escape the fire by crawling through the air conditioning ventilation system with the intention of reaching the roof. Taylor told Sarah Ellis of Inside Soap that it becomes "a fight for survival. It's life-and-death". After encountering obstacles en route, they reach the roof. Turner pointed out that Jay immediately becomes "very protective" of Ruth. He thought that Jay would forgo his own life to ensure Ruth was safe. At one point, Ruth is left in danger and asks Jay to leave her and save himself; Jay tells Ruth that he would never leave her. Turner called this a "touching moment", but warned that they could not leave the situation alive. Their fate was embargoed until the episode's broadcast, where it was revealed that they survived the fire.

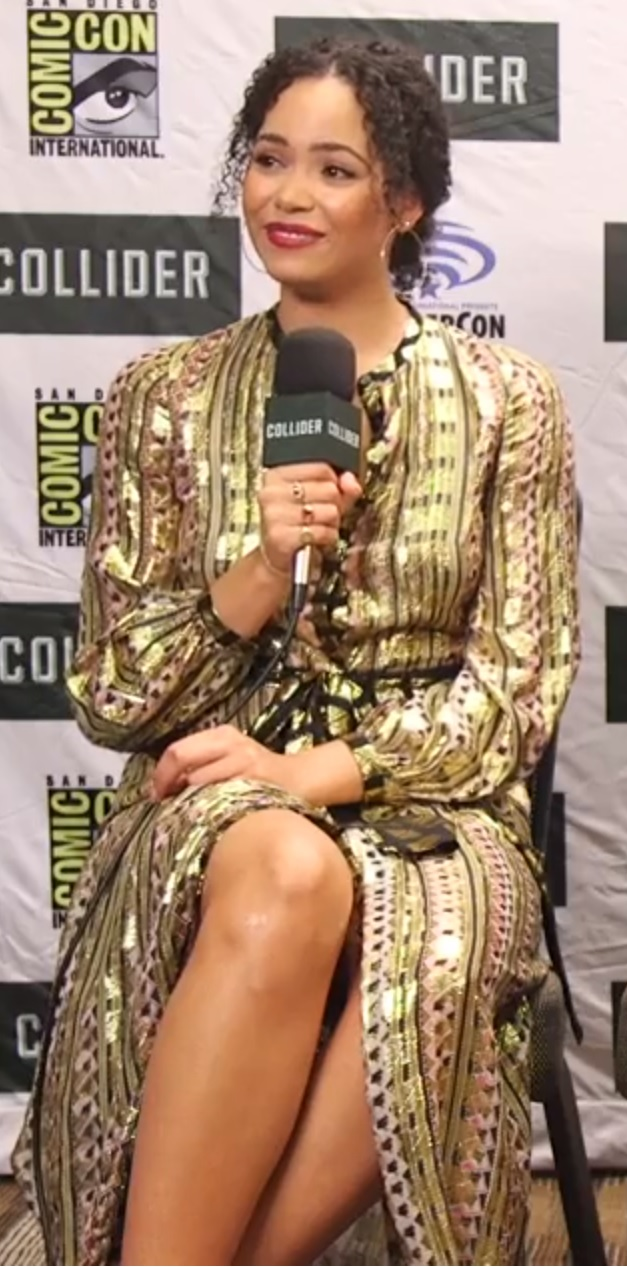
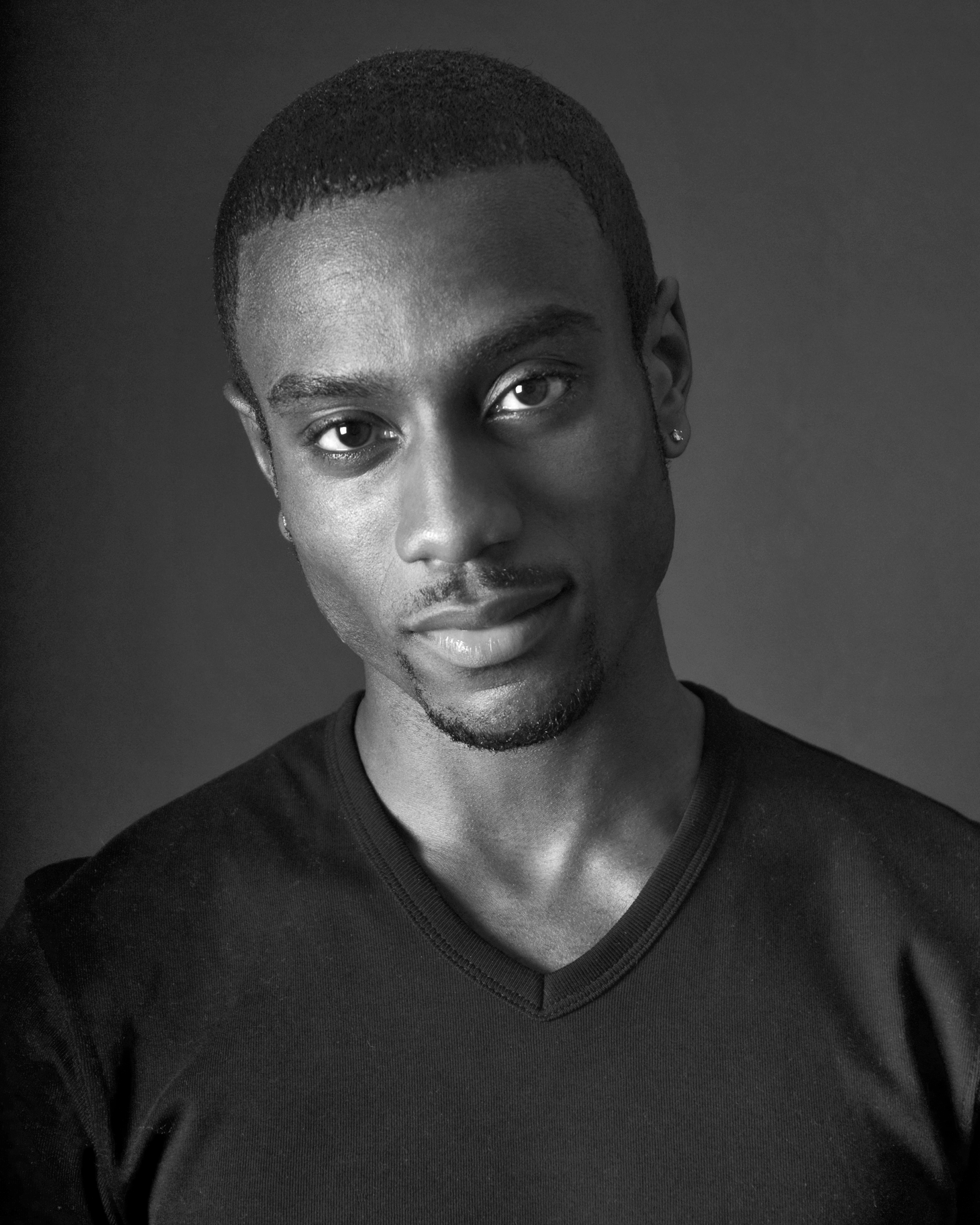
"Next of Kin" developed the characters of Scarlett Conway (Madeleine Mantock, left) and Lloyd Asike (Michael Obiora, right).

"Next of Kin" served to develop the show's characters, especially Scarlett Conway (Madeleine Mantock) and Lloyd Asike (Michael Obiora), two young nurses who were introduced at the start of the series. In the pair, Scarlett has been portrayed as shy, and Lloyd as confident. However, Scarlett's confidence grows after rushing into the fire to save elderly couple Bernard Jones (Alan Rothwell) and Susan Jones (Anne Rutter). Mantock explained that this causes tension between Scarlett and Lloyd because "this tips the scale a little bit". She added that Scarlett struggles to receive praise for her heroics as she "never expected to be the heroine". This moment serves as a turning point in Scarlett's character journey. Contrastingly, the episode creates "a crisis of confidence" for Lloyd as he is hesitant to go back into the ED, unlike Scarlett. Obiora thought that Lloyd acted differently to how he expected to, which "surprised [him] but not pleasantly". This sends Lloyd onto "a mission of redemption".

The episode also set up new stories for the show. During part two, it is revealed that Dylan and Sam Nicholls (Charlotte Salt) are married. Both characters had been introduced to the show across 2011 but their connection was not revealed until that point. Salt was informed about the connection during her audition process and performed a screen test with Beck. Beck learnt about the twist prior to Salt's casting. Salt hoped the twist was a surprise for viewers. She added that Dylan and Sam are both complex characters, which allows the story to run for an extended period of time. Beck did not want the twist to overshadow the main story about Ruth and Jay, which he thought was "so wonderful, lovely and so moving". On how the twist was delivered, he commented, "It was nice to play in a way that wasn’t unrealistically overdramatic."

=== Filming and post-production ===
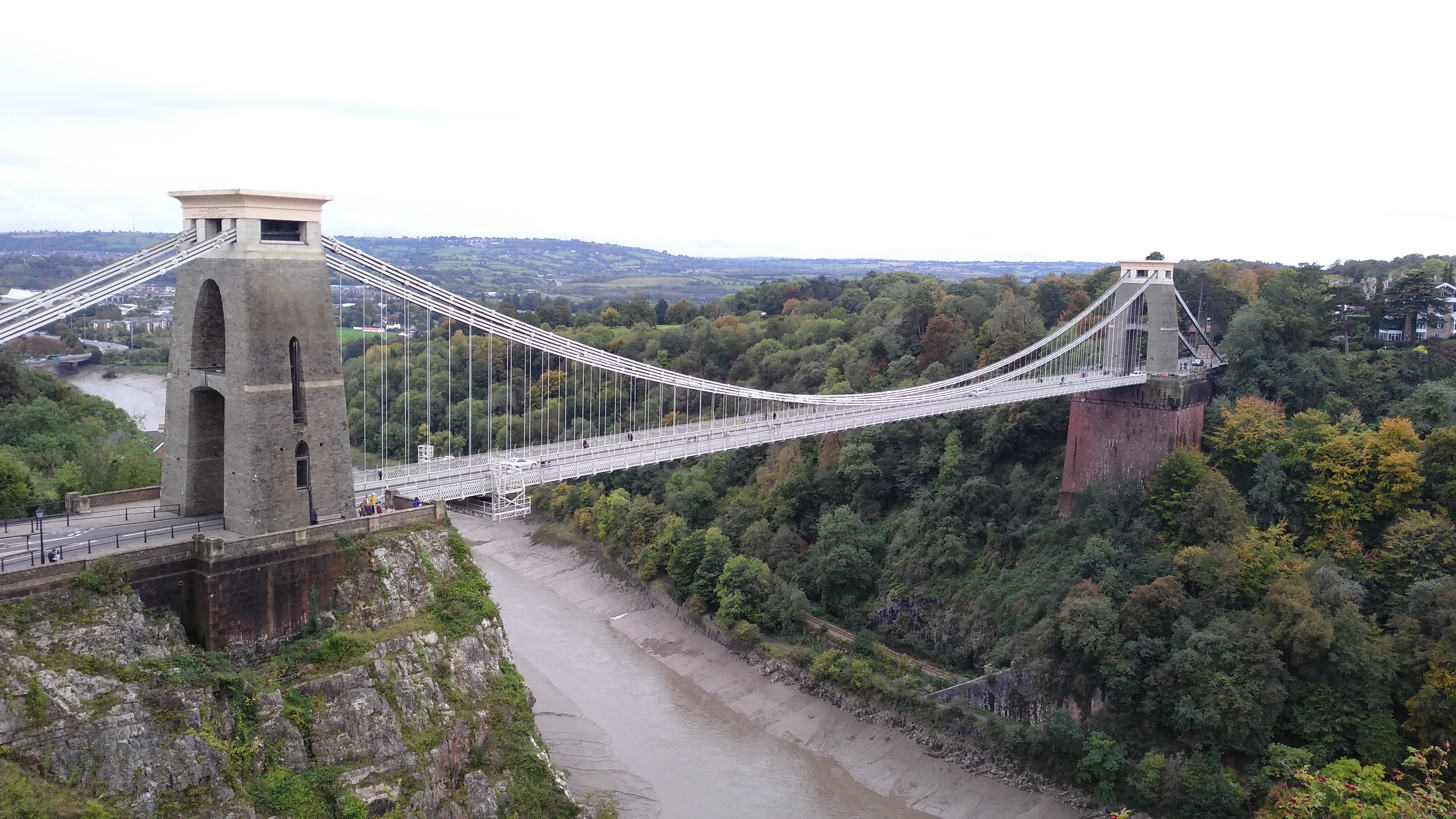
The final scene was filmed at Clifton Suspension Bridge (pictured), marking the end of filming in Bristol.

Filming for the episode took place in August 2011. The first part of the episode contained 73 scenes. "Next of Kin" was partially filmed at the Casualty studio in Bristol, including on the exterior set at the Lawrence Hill Industrial Park. It was the final episode of Casualty to be filmed at these studios. The episode was largely filmed at night in mixed weather conditions. Taylor found this "exhausting" yet "exciting". On his final day of filming, Turner revisited the main set and admitted that he found it "hard to say goodbye to that battered old warehouse!" The final scene of the episode, which depicts Ruth and Jay leaving Holby, was filmed on the Clifton Suspension Bridge, marking the last time it was featured in Casualty. Post-production took place over eight weeks and continued when production moved to the new set on Cardiff. Taylor and Turner visited the new set to re-record some dialogue for "Next of Kin".

Fire scenes could not be filmed at the main studio because it is not fireproof and has ventilation issues. It is also not permitted to film any naked flames at the studio. Producers had to find a way around this, so that they could achieve their goal. They decided to hire two stages at The Bottle Yard Studios in Bristol. On one stage, an elevator build was constructed using the studio's 70 ft (21 m) height. On another stage, a replica of the main part of the Casualty set was created, so that the ED could be set on fire. The rest of the set was created through a blue screen, which serves as a backdrop to the replica set. Garratt explained that the combination of a blue screen stage and the replica set allowed Massey "flexibility" and made the episode "as convincing as possible". Steven Miller, who portrays Lenny Lyons, described the stage as "an enormous hanger-like space" with large blue canvas sheets hung from the ceiling. Every shot filmed on the replica set was also filmed at the main studio to create plate shots. These replaced the blue screens in the final cut, making the background to each shot. When filming the plate shots, set designers had to scorch the set so that matched the fire image created at the replica set.

Computer-generated imagery (CGI) was used to digitally input the "elements" - debris, dust, explosion and flames - into the scene via the blue screens. Elements were filmed on the replica set, although some parts of the episode, including air explosions, were filmed at the main studio. The CGI process was documented in a video by The Giggle Group. Mark Turner, from special effects company MTFX Ltd, explained that CGI had to be used due to the limitations that the set's design offers. Whilst the production team aimed to film as much flame in the primary shot as possible, they added in more elements during post-production to make the stunt appear realistic. Garratt noted that they want the stunt to "feel like a raging inferno". Massey explained that different aspects of smoke were layered onto the scenes in post-production. He commented, "These were small details but they made all the difference." CGI was also used to digitally add fire to characters, since there was restrictions on the level of danger actors could be exposed to. On how much was filmed through CGI, Mantock quipped, "there comes a point where [I ask myself] am I going to be lying in a heap of rubble today?"

One shot featured in the second part of the episode was a tracking shot of the ED on fire, which was filmed on the blue screen stage. This shot created logistical difficulties for the production crew as they needed both the foreground and the background to be tracked, with the addition of the CGI fire. Massey explained that heat haze made some elements in the scene "ripple slightly", so when the background was stitched onto the foreground, it began to move. To solve this issue, the post-production team had to manually stitch the scenes by hand. The ED set features pillars, although they did not reach the full height of the set when recreated onto the replica set. Therefore, the post-production team also had to extend the pillars and the ceiling, and then digitally input the elements of the fire onto those areas. Massey opined that there was "quite a lot going on" in that scene. In total, it took the majority of a week to complete digital production on the tracking shot.

The nature of the episode meant that stunt performers had to be hired to protect the cast from any danger. This was arranged by Julian Simpson, the show's stunt co-ordinator. The final scene of part one uses stuntmen, who double for Miller and Sean Blowers (fire officer Frank Molloy). In the scene, Lenny opens the storeroom door - where the fire is located - and a ball of flame measuring at 3–4 m (10–13 ft) explodes as a result of the backdraft. The explosion consists of compressed air and soft materials, which are designed not to hurt the actors. The stunt performers wore burn suits to protect them from the flames. When the explosion occurs, Lenny and Frank are thrown backwards by the force of the explosion; the stuntmen portraying them were attached to drift wires and pulled backwards through the shot. Turner (MTFX Ltd) opined that it was "the most ambitious" aspect of the episode.

A stunt performer was also used in one of the final scenes as guest character Bin Head (Paul Oldham) is thrown through a glass sign in the ED following an explosion in the department. Although the explosion was as "substantial" as earlier ones in the episode, it was created using only a canister expelling air. When the explosion goes off, the stuntman standing in for Oldham was pulled back by an attached wire, designed to portray the blast of the explosion. Massey noted that the challenge of the sequence was having the explosion blast through the glass. The sequence had to be stitched together during post-production.

At the conclusion of filming the episode, props from the show's time in Bristol, including the clapperboard used for filming "Next of Kin", were donated by the show to Bristol Children's Hospital for use in a charity auction to raise money for the hospital's cardiac unit. Executive producer Johnathan Young was pleased to "give something back" to Bristol and its medical teams in exchange for the support Bristol Royal Infirmary has offered the drama since its conception in 1986.

== Promotion and broadcast ==
External videos
- "Casualty Video Clip: Ruth's dilemma" A preview clip for part one
- "Casualty Video Clip: Ruth and Jay trapped!" A preview clip for part two

On 21 November 2011, the show released a promotional trailer advertising "Next of Kin" and the two episodes prior to it. A 36-second trailer for part one of the episode was released on 26 November. Part two was promoted with a 33-second trailer released on 3 December. A documentary exploring the creation of the episode was released on 8 December 2011.

Both episodes premiered on BBC One and BBC One HD: part one on 3 December 2011 at 20:45; and part two on 10 December 2011 at 20:55. They each ran for 49 minutes. These episodes marked the first to be filmed and broadcast in HD.

== Reception ==
In its original broadcast, part one of "Next of Kin" received an overnight rating of 3.84 million viewers, equivalent to 15.1% of the total audience. This figure later rose to 5.01 million viewers within seven days, a decrease of 210,000 viewers from the previous episode, "The Ties That Bind". In the week ending 4 December 2011, part one was the twentieth most-watched programme on BBC One. The final part of "Next of Kin" received an overnight rating of 4.3 million viewers in its original broadcast, an increase from part one. This equated to 16.2% of the total viewing audience. Viewership increased further to 5.31 million viewers within seven days of its original broadcast. The episode was the fifteenth most-watched programme on BBC One within the week ending 12 December 2011.

Maisie Lillywhite from Bristol Live called these episodes of Casualty an "explosive ending of its Bristol days". Sarah Ellis of Inside Soap wrote of the episodes, "There's explosive action in Casualty this fortnight, as we say goodbye to the drama for this year with a spectacular fire!" She later called the fire "devastating". Emma Bullimore, writing for the Radio Times, was pleased with Ruth and Jay's exit and liked that they received a "happy ending". A South Wales Echo columnist dubbed their exit "dramatic" and found it surprising that they escaped the fire alive. Cheryl Griffin of Holby.tv called Dylan and Sam's marriage twist a "surprising revelation".
