= Accidental Farmer =

- Written by: Daisy Coulam
- Directed by: Mandie Fletcher
- Starring: Ashley Jensen; Michael Hodgson; Jean Heywood; Sylvestra Le Touzel; Shaun Dooley
- Country of origin: United Kingdom
- Original language: English

Production
- Producer: Ellen Taylor
- Running time: 60 minutes

Original release
- Network: BBC1
- Release: 21 December 2010

Accidental Farmer is a television comedy drama by broadcast on BBC1 on 21 December 2010, written by Daisy Coulam.

It is about a London-based advertising executive who moves to a farm in Yorkshire after buying it with her boyfriend's credit card as revenge for cheating on her; and the rigours and problems she encounters on the farm, particularly from being unfamiliar with the rural setting. It is a comedy drama starring Ashley Jensen as the main character, Erin Taylor.

== Cast ==
- Ashley Jensen as Erin Taylor
- Michael Hodgson as Clive
- Jean Heywood as Olive
- Sylvestra Le Touzel as Judith
- Shaun Dooley as Matt
- Raza Jaffrey as Mike
- Sally Phillips as Kat
- Robert Pugh as Dr Willis
- Lynda Baron as Mrs Hobbs

== Ratings ==
The pilot pulled in 4.575 million viewers, a 17.7% share between 9pm and 10pm.
