= Deadwater Fell =

2020 Scottish drama television miniseries

- Cush Jumbo and David Tennant
- Genre: Crime drama
- Created by: Daisy Coulam
- Written by: Daisy Coulam
- Directed by: Lynsey Miller
- Starring: David Tennant; Cush Jumbo; Matthew McNulty; Anna Madeley
- Composer: Natalie Holt
- Country of origin: United Kingdom
- Original language: English
- No. of seasons: 1
- No. of episodes: 4

Production
- Executive producers: Emma Kingsman-Lloyd; Karen Wilson; Daisy Coulam; David Tennant
- Production location: Scotland
- Running time: 45 minutes
- Production company: Kudos

Original release
- Network: Channel 4
- Release: 10 January – 31 January 2020

Deadwater Fell is a four-part British drama television miniseries written and created by Daisy Coulam. It stars David Tennant as a doctor whose wife and three young children are murdered in a fire. It premiered 10 January 2020 on Channel 4.

== Premise ==
Tragedy strikes in a remote Scottish village when a fire rages out of control at the Kendrick home, killing a mother and her three young children. Only the father, the village doctor, is pulled out alive, but all five were drugged. Investigators search for a motive as they discover this seemingly ideal family was far from happy.

== Cast ==
- David Tennant as Tom Kendrick
- Cush Jumbo as Jess Milner
- Matthew McNulty as Police Sergeant Steve Campbell
- Anna Madeley as Kate Kendrick
- Maureen Beattie as Carol Kendrick
- Jamie Michie as Simon Wells
- Laurie Brett as DC Gemma Darlington
- Gordon Brown as DCI Spencer Collins
- Lorn Macdonald as PC Taylor Clarke
- Lindy Whiteford as Ruth McKenzie
- Ron Donachie as Callum McKenzie
- Orla Russell as Emily Kendrick
- Seline Hizli as Sacha
- Jack Greenlees as Luke
- Lewis Gribben as Dylan Denham-Johnson
- Aaron Connell as Elliott Campbell
- Bradley Connell as Lewis Campbell

== Production ==
Channel 4 commissioned the four-part series in January 2019. It was produced by Kudos, part of the Endemol Shine Group. David Tennant and Cush Jumbo were announced as the leads in June, with Matthew McNulty cast as well. Tennant is also an executive producer.

Filming began in June 2019 in Dunlop, Ayrshire, which stood in for the fictional village of Kirkdarroch. Other filming locations included Culzean Country Park; Gateside Place in Kilbarchan, Cumbernauld House Park in Cumbernauld, North Lanarkshire; Irvine Beach and the Low Green Park in Irvine, North Ayrshire. It was directed by Lynsey Miller of Kilwinning, Ayrshire.

== Episodes ==
No.	Directed by	Written by	Original release date	U.K viewers (millions)
1	Lynsey Miller	Daisy Coulam	10 January 2020	5.83
In the peaceful Scottish village of Kirkdarroch, fire breaks out one night at the home of Tom and Kate Kendrick. Their friends and neighbours, Jess Milner and police sergeant Steve, raise the alarm. Steve drags out Kate, who is already dead, but the three Kendrick children are padlocked in a room. Only Tom, the village GP, is pulled out unconscious but survives. It's discovered that all five were drugged before the fire and one of the girls had pine needles on her. CCTV shows Kate buying the padlock. It quickly emerges that the family was not as happy as it seemed. Kate was on antidepressants and had recently flipped her car while driving Jess and the children, and Jess and Tom were having an affair.
2	Lynsey Miller	Daisy Coulam	17 January 2020	5.26
The residents of Kirkdarroch come out in force for the funerals of the girls and Kate Kendrick. Tom gives the eulogy, but there is no mention of Kate. Kate has been cut out of all the photos with her daughters. Jess meets an old friend of Kate's - and is deeply shocked by what she discovers. As the village grieves, Jess wrestles with her part in the tragedy. The investigation takes a new turn when a witness comes forward, and the police home in on their prime suspect. Intimate secrets come to light.
3	Lynsey Miller	Daisy Coulam	24 January 2020	5.22
Steve is suspended for interfering with a witness. Armed with new evidence, the case looks cut and dried, but a new revelation raises doubt as the emotional ripple effects of the fire take their toll on those closest to the tragedy. Steve goes to his work-appointed counselling and a past conversation with Kate is revealed. As the truth begins to emerge, everyone questions their role in the tragedy.
4	Lynsey Miller	Daisy Coulam	31 January 2020	5.05
As the villagers try to rebuild their lives, they have to learn to be honest with themselves and each other. However, whether they ever get to the truth remains to be seen. Jess and Tom's mother go to the police to report his menacing and threatening behavior. Jess is determined to discover the truth about what happened on that night, while also mending her damaged relationship with her boyfriend Steve and helping his children face their sadness.

== Reception ==
The first episode of Deadwater Fell received positive reviews from critics. David Craig of Radio Times gave it four out of five, calling it a "complex and fascinating mystery". He praised screenwriter Daisy Coulam for fleshing out the characters, particularly Kate Kendrick (Anna Madeley): "While Deadwater Fell might initially sound like another case of 'disposable woman' in the crime genre, writer Daisy Coulam deserves recognition for elevating the character of Kate above such a trope."

Lucy Mangan of The Guardian likewise rated it four out of five, comparing it positively to Broadchurch: "Whether it will catch the public imagination like Broadchurch did is anybody's guess. It feels far more solidly engineered, easily as convincing in its portrait of a small community suddenly shattered by an awful event, and it elicits more emotional investment from the off. I'm finding it an irresistible treat, but these things are essentially alchemical and unpredictable. Broadchurch with freckles – think of it like that if it'll help. Come on in; the Deadwater's lovely."
