= Daisy Coulam =

English screenwriter

- Born: Ryde, Isle of Wight, England
- Occupations: Television writer producer
- Known for: Grantchester

Daisy Coulam is a British television producer and screenwriter known for creating of the long-running murder mystery series Grantchester for ITV in 2014.

== Biography ==
Coulam is from Ryde on the Isle of Wight, and attended Ryde High school.

Coulam's early work in television included storylining Family Affairs and script editing The Bill. Following her work on The Bill, she was awarded a place on the BBC Writer's Academy, a programme designed to train new writers, and got to write on Doctors, EastEnders, Casualty and its spinoff, Holby City. She'd move into primetime, writing Death in Paradise and Humans. Grantchester was based on The Grantchester Mysteries, collections of short stories written by James Runcie. The first series was based on the six stories from the first book, Sidney Chambers and the Shadow of Death, and was broadcast in 2014. It was a huge success and was recommissioned for several further series.

She also created the miniseries Deadwater Fell for Channel 4 in 2020, starring David Tennant as a Scottish doctor whose wife and three young children are murdered in a shocking fire.

== Filmography ==
Year	Title	Notes	Broadcaster
2007-2008	Holby City	2 episodes	BBC One
2007-2011	Casualty	14 episodes	BBC One
2007-2014	Eastenders	27 episodes	BBC One
2008	Doctors	1 episode	BBC One
2010	Accidental Farmer	Pilot	BBC One
2014	Death in Paradise	1 episode	BBC One
2014–present	Grantchester	Creator, 51 episodes	ITV
2018	Humans	2 episodes	Channel 4
2020	Deadwater Fell	Creator, all episodes	Channel 4
