= David Bowker (writer) =

British author and screenwriter

David Bowker is a British author and screenwriter. Born in Manchester, England, Bowker has written seven novels. He has also worked as a journalist and as a columnist on The Times. He has various film projects in development and his TV work includes episodes of Casualty and Coronation Street. He is currently working on his eighth novel.

Bowker's book, How to Be Bad was recommended by Esquire magazine as one of the books of 2005.

== Selected works ==
=== Books ===
- The Death Prayer (1995)
- The Secret Sexist (1996)
- The Butcher of Glastonbury (1997)
- From Stockport With Love (1999)
- Rawhead (2002), retitled The Death You Deserve in 2003 for its American release
- I Love My Smith & Wesson (2004), retitled Rawhead In Love the same year
- How To Be Bad (2005)

=== Radio ===
- Big Boys Don't Cry (BBC Radio 4, 1992)

=== Television ===
- Truants (BBC1, 2004)
- Coronation Street (ITV1, 2008–2009) (6 episodes)
- Casualty (BBC1, 2008–present) (10 episodes) Core Writer
