= Steven Miller (actor) =

Scottish actor (born 1982)

- Born: Steven Miller; 13 March 1982 (age 44); Stirling, Scotland
- Occupation: Actor

Steven Miller (born 13 March 1982) is a Scottish actor best known for his role as Lenny Lyons in the long-running British medical drama Casualty. He trained at the Bristol Old Vic Theatre School and is originally from Tillicoultry. Other TV shows he has appeared in include Holby City, The Composer's Specials, and The Bill. He became more widely known since he appeared as supporting actor in the 2025 Scottish series Dept. Q.

== Filmography ==
Year	Title	Role	Notes
2004	A Christmas Carol	Young Ebenezer Scrooge	TV movie
2006	The Bill	Curtis Shaw	1 episode
2009	Holby City	Barney Collins	1 episode
2009–2012, 2016	Casualty	Lenny Lyons	115 episodes, plus 30th Anniversary Special
2013	Our Girl	Corporal Leech	Episode: "Pilot"
2013	Coming Up	Steve	1 episode
2015	Father Brown	Lieutenant Anthony Graham	1 episode
2016	Silent Witness	Steve Monk	Episode: "In Plain Sight"
2019	Traces	Andy Jarvis	1 episode
2022	The Walk-In	Young Lenny	2 episodes
2023-2024	Shetland	Reverend Alan Calder	12 episodes
2023	Payback	DS Rob Livingston	6 episodes
2025	Dept. Q	Sam Haig/Lyle Jennings	9 episodes
2026	Vigil	Sargeant Mark Cunningham	6 episodes

== Theatre credits ==
- Paradise Lost
- Cargo
- Richard II
- Long Short and Tall
- Fiddler on the Roof
- Lord of the Rings
- Blackwatch
- 2014 The Perfect Murder UK tour – Detective Roy Grace
- James I: The Key Will Keep the Lock
- Sunshine on Leith
- A Christmas Carol
- Othello
