= Sally Abbott =

British screenwriter

- Occupations: Screenwriter, playwright, theatre director, producer
- Known for: The Coroner; Vera; EastEnders

Sally Abbott is a British screenwriter, playwright and former theatre producer, best known for the BBC1 crime drama The Coroner, which ran for two series.

== Career ==
She worked in theatre for 18 years as a producer, young people's director and trainer at Contact Theatre, English Touring Theatre, Liverpool's Everyman Theatre and the National Association of Youth Theatres, before concentrating on writing. She was awarded a place on the BBC Writer's Academy, a programme designed to train new writers for their long running television series, with her horror spec Camp Fear. She went on to write for all four of the BBC's popular continuing dramas: Doctors, EastEnders, Casualty and its spinoff, Holby City.

She also wrote for Series 8 of Death in Paradise, and multiple episodes of Call the Midwife and Vera. Abbott returned to the theatre, as a playwright, writing the stage monologue Borough Market, One Saturday (2017) and wrote Frantic Assembly's 25th anniversary show I Think We Are Alone (Frantic Assembly, 2020) co-directed by Kathy Burke and Scott Graham. Abbot joined the writing team of Channel 5’s 2026 thriller series Missed Call.

=== The Coroner ===
Abbott created The Coroner from an idea by Will Trotter, executive producer and head of BBC Drama Birmingham, about a woman coroner aged about 40 and in a location such as the Cotswolds or Devon. It starred Claire Goose as Jane Kennedy, a coroner based in a fictional South Devon coastal town. Matt Bardock stars as Detective Sergeant Davey Higgins. The series would have self-contained stories with drama and humour; a formula successfully used in Father Brown from the same production team. The characters, Jane and Davey, were based on Katharine Hepburn and Spencer Tracy in Adam's Rib with the unresolved sexual tension between them. Abbott wrote the Davey character with Matt Bardock in mind. She created four other characters to complete the cast.

The BBC announced on 2 March 2017 that there would be no further series.

== Personal life ==
Abbott was married to actor Michael Begley. She has two children. Her son Tige Burns is the frontman for alternative rock band the Sukis. She co-created and developed a children's show "My Life Sucks" with her daughter Ella Burns, for Red Planet Pictures and CBBC, whilst Ella was still at school.
