= Casualty series 24 =

Twenty-fourth series of Casualty

Casualty
- Series 24
- Starring: Laura Aikman; Matt Bardock; Charles Dale; Sophia Di Martino; Michael French; Lucy Gaskell; Tristan Gemmill; Sam Grey; Jane Hazlegrove; Gillian Kearney; Tony Marshall; Steven Miller; Suzanne Packer; Sunetra Sarker; Will Sharpe; Georgia Taylor; Derek Thompson; Ben Turner
- No. of episodes: 48

Release
- Original network: BBC One
- Original release: 12 September 2009 – 21 August 2010

Series chronology
- ← Previous; Series 23 Next → Series 25

The twenty-fourth series of the British medical drama television series Casualty commenced airing in the United Kingdom on BBC One on 12 September 2009 and finished on 21 August 2010. Events of the series included a crossover with sister show Holby City.

== Production ==
The series was produced by the BBC and aired on BBC One in the United Kingdom. In April 2010, series production staff staged a protest at the Casualty studios over the dismissal of seven staff members from the show's props department. Media entertainment trade union BECTU claimed that the staff members were dismissed after 11 months and two weeks of service so that the BBC could avoid granting them rights allowed to employees who have worked for the company for a year or longer. Bectu supervisory official Helen Ryan stated: "This treatment of individuals would be unacceptable and immoral coming from any employer. However the fact this it is the BBC, a publicly funded and universally respected broadcaster will cause many to view the BBC in a new light." A petition against the decision was circulated, and BECTU representatives urged the dismissed employees to launch a formal appeal against the BBC.

== Cast ==
=== Overview ===
Casualty features an ensemble cast of characters in the medical profession, who work in the hospital's Emergency Department. In series 24, Tristan Gemmill, Michael French and Sunetra Sarker played consultants Adam Trueman, Nick Jordan and Zoe Hanna, Georgia Taylor appeared as doctor Ruth Winters, and Steven Miller (actor), Will Sharpe and Laura Aikman played F2s Lenny Lyons, Yuki Reid and May Phelps. Derek Thompson, Suzanne Packer and Ben Turner appeared as nurses Charlie Fairhead, Tess Bateman and Jay Faldren. Jane Hazlegrove, Matt Bardock and Sophia Di Martino played paramedics Kathleen "Dixie" Dixon, Jeff Collier and Polly Emmerson. Charles Dale appeared as hospital porter MacKenzie "Big Mac" Chalker, and Sam Grey played healthcare assistant Alice Chantrey. Chantrey departed from the show mid-series. Tony Marshall continued his role as receptionist Noel Garcia. Gillian Kearney played nurse Jessica Harrison from the beginning of the series until episode 24, "An Ugly Truth". Kearney briefly reprised her role for two episodes, "New Beginnings" and "A Better Past". Aikman also departed during the course of the series, resuming her role in episode 48, "What Tonight Means to Me – Part One". Lucy Gaskell was cast as new nurse Kirsty Clements.

The series featured several recurring characters, and numerous guest stars. Georgia Tennant appeared as new F2 doctor Heather. Joe McFadden played recurring homeless patient Alistair, who befriended Polly and appeared in Casualty's first webisode, "The Parting of the Ways". Robert Boulter appeared as F2 Kieron Fletcher, Raymond Coulthard played anaesthetist Matt Strong, and Michael Maloney was consultant Howard Fairfax. Stephanie Beacham played Monica, an ardent feminist, who ended up in the ED after injuring herself on a light fitting, while Ron Moody starred as an elderly vagrant. Linda Robson featured as Louise, a single mother who discovers that her troublesome teenage son has bipolar disorder. Former Blue member Anthony Costa appeared as a man who doused his prostitute girlfriend with petrol. Barry Sloane played Davey Blake, a childhood friend of F2 Lenny Lyons (Steven Miller), and Chris Fountain appeared as Seb, a patient with leukaemia. Margaret John played a pensioner embarking on a relationship for the first time. Matthew Needham guest-starred in episode three, "And Then There Were Three", reprising his role as Toby De Silva. Mark Letheren played Toby's partner, hospital counsellor Ben Harding. Evelyn Hoskyns appeared as Shona Wark, the pregnant girlfriend of Charlie's son Louis (Gregory Foreman). Paul Bradley appeared as his Holby City character Elliot Hope as part of a crossover storyline. Brenda Fricker, an original Casualty character, reprised her role as Megan Roach as part of a guest story arc culminating with her character's death.

=== Main characters ===
- Laura Aikman as May Phelps (episodes 1–35 and 47)
- Matt Bardock as Jeff Collier
- Charles Dale as Big Mac
- Sophia Di Martino as Polly Emmerson
- Michael French as Nick Jordan (from episode 4)
- Lucy Gaskell as Kirsty Clements (from episode 36)
- Tristan Gemmill as Adam Trueman
- Sam Grey as Alice Chantrey (until episode 34)
- Jane Hazlegrove as Kathleen "Dixie" Dixon
- Gillian Kearney as Jessica Harrison (until episode 23, episodes 34–35)
- Tony Marshall as Noel Garcia
- Steven Miller as Lenny Lyons (from episode 1)
- Suzanne Packer as Tess Bateman
- Sunetra Sarker as Zoe Hanna
- Will Sharpe as Yuki Reid (from episode 1)
- Georgia Taylor as Ruth Winters
- Derek Thompson as Charlie Fairhead
- Ben Turner as Jay Faldren

=== Recurring characters ===
- Stephen Billington as Edward Thurlow (from episode 38)
- Robert Boulter as Kieron Fletcher (episodes 25–34)
- Tom Chadbon as Henry Williams
- Paul Copley as Arthur Dixon (episodes 23–30)
- Raymond Coulthard as Matt Strong (episodes 25–34)
- Richard Dillane as Sean Anderson (episodes 13–20)
- Danny Emes as Lucas Anderson (until episode 23)
- Miffy Englefield as Amelia Anderson (until episode 23)
- Gregory Foreman as Louis Fairhead (episodes 12–25)
- Evelyn Hoskins as Shona Wark (episodes 12–48)
- Michael Maloney as Howard Fairfox (episodes 26–32)
- Alec Newman as Robert Ludlow (episodes 36–48)

=== Guest characters ===
- Paul Bradley as Elliot Hope (episode 24)
- Brenda Fricker as Megan Roach (episodes 43–46)
- Mark Letheren as Ben Harding (episodes 3 and 25)
- David Mallison as Eddie Lanchester (episodes 13–25)
- Joe McFadden as Alistair (episodes 1–13)
- Matthew Needham as Toby De Silva (episode 3)
- Georgia Tennant as Heather Whitefield (episodes 1–2)
- Christine Tremarco as Linda Andrews (episodes 20 and 23)

== Episodes ==
No. overall	No. in series	Title	Directed by	Written by	Original release date	UK viewers (millions)
687	1	"Dawn of the ED – Part One"	Paul Murphy	Daisy Coulam	12 September 2009	5.75
Adam Trueman (Tristan Gemmill) begins his first day as Clinical Lead of the ED by greeting the eight new F2 doctors, including Heather Whitefield (Georgia Tennant), May Phelps (Laura Aikman), Yuki Reid (Will Sharpe) and Lenny Lyons (Steven Miller). Adam and Heather attend a call-out to a deserted shopping centre, where one patient is trapped in an industrial fan, another has fallen from a balcony, and numerous homeless people are living in the basement. Unaware that the centre is occupied, its owner rigs the building with explosives as part of an insurance scam, detonating it with dozens of people trapped inside. Note: First appearance of Lenny Lyons (Steven Miller), Yuki Reid (Will Sharpe), May Phelps (Laura Aikman), Heather Whitefield (Georgia Tennant) & Alistair (Joe McFadden).
688	2	"Dawn of the ED – Part Two"	Paul Murphy	Daisy Coulam	13 September 2009	5.94
Jeff Collier (Matt Bardock) attempts to rescue his colleagues trapped in the burning shopping centre, but becomes trapped himself and collapses in the process. Polly (Sophia Di Martino) and Dixie (Jane Hazlegrove) wait anxiously for news, while at the hospital Adam's partner/nurse Jessica Harrison (Gillian Kearney) does likewise. The new F2s are overwhelmed by the number of casualties admitted following the incident. Polly befriends Alistair, a homeless man she meets during the crisis. Most of the team escape to safety, but Heather falls to her death. Note: Final appearance of Heather Whitefield (Georgia Tennant).
689	3	"And Then There Were Three"	Ian Barnes	Mark Catley	19 September 2009	5.91
In the aftermath of Heather's death, Adam has May, Yuki and Lenny work with consultant Zoe Hanna (Sunetra Sarker), who separates the three of them. Yuki is sent to work with Jeff and Polly, May works with Ruth Winters (Georgia Taylor) and Lenny works with Zoe. All three struggle with their work, and are banned from treating patients for the remainder of the shift. They are sent to see counsellor Ben Harding (Mark Letheren), who motivates them to work as a team. Toby De Silva (Matthew Needham) briefly returns to share a drink with the staff. Note: Guest appearance of Toby De Silva (Matthew Needham) and Ben Harding (Mark Letheren).
690	4	"Sunset Syndrome"	Ian Barnes	Dana Fainaru	26 September 2009	6.06
Nick Jordan (Michael French) is suffering from a terminal brain tumour. When Zoe discovers he is in hospital, she forges his signature and signs consent papers for surgery he had previously refused, motivated by her guilt at the end of their relationship. The surgery is successful, and Nick's life is saved.
691	5	"Not Forgotten"	Alan Grint	Tom Bidwell	3 October 2009	6.37
Jay Faldren (Ben Turner) asks Ruth to publicly acknowledge their relationship. After making a good impression on her boss, Sarah Evans, Ruth kisses Jay in the reception area, alerting their colleagues to their relationship. When they go home, Ruth realises she has forgotten to take the pill, and wonders if she is pregnant. When Nick discovers Zoe's deception, he is furious with her. The F2s are disillusioned with Adam's management style, but give him a second chance when he impresses them in resus.
692	6	"Comfort Zone"	Alan Grint	Karen Laws	10 October 2009	5.52
Ruth discovers that she is pregnant, and is invited to a surgeons' dinner by Sarah. Jeff take an instant disliking to his new partner, and reports him to Dixie when he finds him going through a patient's personal belongings. Nick is discharged into Zoe's care, but is still angry with her and goes home alone. Adam is angry with Zoe for being remiss in her duties at work, and the department are surprised when she announces Nick is recovering and well. Note: Guest appearances of Dr Frances Lively (Josette Simon) & Tasmeen Haron (Pooja Ghai).
693	7	"Love is a Sacrifice"	Dermot Boyd	Rachel Flowerday	18 October 2009	5.04
Ruth decides to have an abortion. She does not invite Jay to the surgeons' dinner, but he turns up anyway, and is thrown out just as Ruth collapses. Charlie visits a depressed Nick, who is unhappy with his condition following his operation. The F2s and Jessica are held hostage in resus by the angry relative of a dying patient. They perform a difficult procedure on the patient, observed by Adam from outside the room.
694	8	"Not Wisely But Too Well"	Dermot Boyd	Jason Sutton & Daisy Coulam	24 October 2009	5.46
Following her collapse at the surgeons' dinner, Ruth is admitted to the emergency department. Sarah tells her that she must not have any distractions if she wants to remain on her team, so Ruth pushes Jay away. The F2s work on the case of a patient who claims to be able to see elves. When Yuki successfully diagnoses him, May asks him out. Zoe discovers her new boyfriend Joel is only 15 and still in school. He steals a memory stick containing patient files to ensure that Zoe will be forced to see him again.
695	9	"Regrets"	Adrian Vitoria	Suzie Smith & Ellen Taylor	31 October 2009	5.63
Zoe tells Adam about the missing memory stick, and is given until 4pm to get it back. Nick helps her, tracking down Joel who is on a school field trip to the zoo. Joel attempts to swallow the memory stick, but chokes and is admitted as a patient. Alistair breaks into Polly's flat in the misguided belief they are in a relationship. Polly is terrified, and calls the police when he leaves.
696	10	"Every Breath You Take"	Jon Sen	Sally Tatchell	7 November 2009	5.40
Nick returns to work in the emergency department in an administrative capacity. The department is busy following an accident with fireworks at a local pub, and Nick steps in to help Lenny with the casualties. Jeff works his first solo shift as a rapid responder, but is attacked from behind by an unknown assailant. Polly visits the hostel Alistair is staying at, where she discovers he has erected a shrine to her.
697	11	"Leave Me Standing"	Jon Sen	Abi Bown	14 November 2009	5.51
Yuki, May and Lenny are excited to be given a patient of their own to treat – Ruth's friend Amir. They ignore advice from Nick and follow their own treatment plan, leading to Amir's death. Polly continues to worry about Alistair who committed suicide.
698	12	"Second Chance"	Declan O'Dwyer	Paul Mari	21 November 2009	5.69
The F2s argue throughout a busy shift, during which they deal with the casualties from a fire and a car accident victim with cerebral palsy. In an attempt to impress Sarah, Ruth does not seek help in her treatment of the cerebral palsy patient, whose condition worsens, forcing Nick to step in.
699	13	"The Devil You Know"	Declan O'Dwyer	Jeff Povey	28 November 2009	5.14
The dean of medicine announces a new Junior Academic Fellowship Award, which will see one of the F2s win a role in the emergency department with an excellent salary. Polly struggles to treat Gal, a bank manager shot during a robbery. Nick wishes to treat patients but Adam refuses to let him. Jessica's former husband Sean returns from Saudi Arabia. Note: Return of Sean Andrews (Richard Dillane) and final appearance of Alistair (Joe McFadden).
700	14	"As Others See Us"	David O'Neill	Mark Cairns	5 December 2009	5.04
Ruth's estranged brother Jonathan arrives at the hospital seeking her help. He claims to have reformed, but Ruth suspects he is still taking drugs. Mick, a security guard seeking Ruth's approval, takes on a group of drunken homeless men who are stealing hand sanitizer from the wards. Jonathan steps in to help, hoping to convince Ruth he has changed. Sean interferes with Jessica and Adam's wedding plans. Note: Guest appearance of Jonathan Winters (Anthony Grundy).
701	15	"No More Heroes"	David O'Neill	Sally Abbott	12 December 2009	4.84
Yuki is struggling in the competition for the fellowship and Zoe advises him to ask May out for a drink to boost his confidence. Nick is unable to contact Adam, who is at a school play with Jessica, so decides to treat a patient himself, despite his bar on performing clinical duties. Polly attends Alistair's funeral where she is verbally abused by his friend Abe, who blames her for his death.
702	16	"All I Want for Christmas"	Alan Grint	Martin Jameson	19 December 2009	7.02
Frustrated at the lack of encouragement she has received in the fellowship competition, May plays a trick on Lenny, who mistakenly tells two sisters that their father has died. He is severely reprimanded by Adam for the mistake. Ruth happily anticipates spending Christmas with her brother, until she realises he has been stealing from her. Adam forces Nick to recognise that his future in the department depends on his acceptance of working only in an administrative capacity.
703	17	"Tidings of Comfort and Joy" (Note: See also "Comfort and Joy" series 8)	Alan Grint	Sasha Hails	27 December 2009	4.52
Zoe gives Noel a life to his father's Christmas party in a local old people's home. Noel is upset that his father no longer recognises him, and is concerned that he and several other residents appear to be ill. He asks Zoe to help the afflicted. The F2s are on their way to a Christmas party when they come across a car crash. They manage to stabilise the patients and transport them to the emergency department, and are lauded as heroes by Adam in front of their colleagues and the Dean of Medicine. The Dean mentions that May is his daughter, angering Lenny and Yuki who were unaware of her connections. Ruth admits that she is lonely when she works with Jay on a case. She accepts his comfort and they go home together. Note: Guest appearance of Eddie Lanchester, Dean of Medicine (David Mallison).
704	18	"A Day in a Life"	Patrick Harkins	Daisy Coulam & Dana Fainaru	2 January 2010	7.59
After drinking heavily the night before, Adam arrives late for his own wedding to Jessica. Midway through the service, Tess announces there has been a major road accident. Adam breaks off the wedding to return to the hospital and treat patients. Yuki and May work well in the crisis unit, but Yuki struggles to forgive May for her deception. Ruth is impressed by Jay's sensitive treatment of a patient, and decides to admit to him that she had an abortion. Adam and Jessica have their union blessed in the hospital chapel. On the way to their reception, Adam swerves to avoid hitting an oncoming vehicle and skids onto a frozen lake. Amelia and Lucas escape from the vehicle as the ice begins to crack, but Jessica, Adam and Harry are submerged into the water. Following the car accident, Adam tries to focus as he fights feelings of claustrophobia while he, Jessica and the kids are trapped in the car on the frozen lake. He manages to calm down but, when Harry cries and Jessica leans back to comfort him, the shift in weight causes the ice to crack and the passenger front side is submerged in water. At the wedding reception, Zoe assumes Jessica has hung up on her and, alone with an unamused Jordan, she downs another glass of champagne. Jordan leaves but stops when he sees Zoe rushing out frantically after him and they rush to the hospital in preparation. Ruth and Jay's relationship, meanwhile, has taken a turn for the better but is it time for Ruth to get something off her chest which has been troubling her for some while? Back at the hospital, the team battle under hopeless conditions to save the accident victims. As things go from bad to worse, Jordan is put in an impossible situation as he wonders whether he should help his desperate colleagues, despite knowing that he's not allowed to practise. Note: This is a feature-length (105m) episode and shows the final appearance of Harry Trueman (Lorenzo Jefferson).
705	19	"Dark Places"	Declan Eames	Rob Williams	9 January 2010	7.24
Davey, a friend of Lenny's from his years in foster care, arrives at the hospital intent on carrying out a plan they made as children, to burn down the children's home they lived in. Davey goes through with the plan, unaware there is still a child inside the building. The hearing into Polly's professional conduct over Alistair takes place, distressing Polly. Charlie's son Louis arrives at the hospital in need of money, and Charlie experiences health problems. Adam tells Jessica that their infant son Harry died in the car accident. Note: Guest appearance of Davey Blair (Barry Sloane) and return of Louis Fairhead (Gregory Foreman).
706	20	"Leave Me Alone"	Will Sinclair	Mark Catley	16 January 2010	6.85
Following the traumatic events of the New Year, Jessica takes a look back at her life, loves and career at Holby. It's 1998 and Jessica is a young nurse, casually flirting with Sean and enjoying wild nights out with best mate Linda (Christine Tremarco). When Linda leaves to travel around America she gives Jessica a pebble saying that if Jessica ever finds herself in trouble it will be her lucky charm. A few years later, Jessica and Sean get married. Sean is keen for Jessica to take elocution lessons so that she sounds like a successful surgeon's wife and Jessica is keen to return to work after the birth of Amelia – much to Sean's distaste. It appears that married life isn't a bed of roses for the couple. When Amelia is older, Sean and Jessica's marriage is on shaky ground when, at a low ebb, Jessica meets Adam in a pub, goes home with him and is moved by their strong connection. Back in the present day, Linda checks up on her old friend and it's time for Adam to find out how his confession has been received. Note: First appearance of Linda Andrews Christine Tremarco and final appearance of Sean Andrews (Richard Dillane).
707	21	"Last Roll of the Dice"	Declan Eames	Sally Tatchell	23 January 2010	6.86
While Adam keeps waiting by Jessica's bedside, life goes on in the ED with exams approaching for the increasingly stressed F2s. When May fails to impress Ruth and makes a clinical error, Ruth unleashes a barrage of anger on her mentee. Feeling low and worried May retaliates, resulting in a furious Ruth sending her home. Lenny can't believe his luck – with May having such a rough time and Yuki unexpectedly missing, it looks like the Fellowship is in the bag. Still raw from her confession about the abortion, Ruth has a heated conversation about May with Jay, during which he tells Ruth that she should try to be more empathetic. Brought up short by this, Ruth pays May a visit at home, where she is horrified to see May slumped in a chair, with an open bottle of wine and some pills nearby. The Ambulance Trust has made its decision in Polly's tribunal about Alistair's death, but she doesn't care either way; too scarred by events, she is determined to resign anyway. Jeff and Dixie blame each other and set out to do everything they can to change her mind. After a long shift, the team head off to five-a-side football practice. Yuki is in disappointing form, but Charlie is delighted to be selected, despite his fitness levels. But his smile soon disappears when Shona arrives looking for the errant Louis. She has some big, life-changing news for Charlie and his son. Note: Guest appearance of Shona (Evelyn Hoskins).
708	22	"The Cradle Will Fall"	Ian Barnes	Michael Levine	30 January 2010	6.55
It is the day of the F2s' exam and all are on edge. May is given a pep talk by her father and is shocked when he hands her an envelope with the exam questions inside in order to help her along her way. The F2s are rattled when Jordan reveals that the exam will also include a day-long assessment, with Henry overseeing. As the day progresses, Lenny is disgruntled to be given a case in cubicles, while May and Yuki are given 'exciting' resus medicine. Yuki falters while treating seriously ill teenager Seb but redeems himself when he comes up with a brilliant diagnosis. However when Yuki bravely tells a packed resus, including Seb's father, that Seb told him he no longer wants treatment, Henry orders him out. Yuki is disappointed but Henry cheers him up by saying that there's more to medicine than books. Lenny is disappointed to be stuck in cubicles and, determined to impress, orders a series of tests for a patient. However he is distressed to realise that the tests have revealed something sinister and he tries in vain to persuade his patient to accept treatment. May initially impresses Henry when Sarah Evans is rushed to the ED having collapsed in theatre. May's confidence leads her to throw the exam paper away but it seems this is an act – she fails to chase up a test result, putting Sarah in danger. Henry is furious with her, but her day gets even worse when she realises her father and Sarah had an affair. It's the day of Harry's funeral and Jessica rejects Adam's support, insisting she wants to return to work the next week. Charlie tries to persuade Louis to face up to his parental responsibilities. Ruth finally gathers the courage to tell Jay that she loves him but it's too late – he walks away. Note: Guest appearance of Eddie Lanchester, Dean of Medicine (David Mallison) & Shona (Evelyn Hoskins).
709	23	"An Ugly Truth"	Ian Barnes	Mark Catley	6 February 2010	6.53
Adam and Jessica's relationship is fractured – they can only relax when they are working, separately, amongst their colleagues and patients. Jessica is shocked to see her old friend Linda, and touched when she realizes her friend sent her a keepsake to keep her going in her hour of need. Jessica confesses to Linda that she's finding it hard to live and work with Adam when he reminds her so much of Harry, but when Linda jokingly suggests Jessica come to America with her, she is surprised when Jessica agrees. Jessica tells a devastated Adam that she can no longer stay in Holby and, despite his own feelings, he lets her go. Later, Adam is surrounded by his friends from the ED – Jessica wrote them each a note asking them to look after Adam now she has gone. Charlie persuades a reluctant Louis to talk to Shona, but is disappointed when he refuses to support her. Feeling sorry for her, Charlie cancels his appointment to support Shona at her midwife meeting. When he leaves, he gives her some money for which she appears to be genuinely grateful. But when Charlie leaves, Shona scoffs and pockets the money, alongside a bag full of drugs and cigarettes. It's the day of the F2s exam results, and all are pleased to have passed – especially May, who has finished top of the class. Dixie is stunned when her dad, Arthur, arrives and tells her he doesn't have long to live. He jumps to conclusions when he sees Jeff and Dixie together, and tells Dixie he's delighted that she's in a relationship. Seeing how happy this has made him, Dixie doesn't correct him. Note: Guest appearance of Shona (Evelyn Hoskins) and Arthur Dixon (Paul Copley). Temporary Departure of Jessica Harrison (Gillian Kearney). Final appearance of Amelia Anderson (Miffy Englefield) & Lucas Anderson (Danny Emes).
710	24	"Love Is a Battlefield"	Simon Meyers	Paul Logue	13 February 2010	7.13
Charlie's chest pains are worsening, and his stress levels increase further when he gets a phone call from the police and Louis – Shona has broken into his house. He angers Louis by refusing to press charges against Shona, vowing to deal with her himself. Later he is forced to chase Shona around Holby and finds her drunk and high, slumped in a graveyard. He starts to drive her home, but a combination of the day's events and worsening pains causes Charlie to cough up blood. Shona rushes for help and Charlie is whisked into the ED, where the team stabilise him. The gang rally round as Charlie is taken upstairs to Elliot and the Holby team. Adam insists he's fine to work, but when he upsets a patient, Jordan orders him to attend a counselling session before he returns. Annoyed, Adam begrudgingly agrees but, when he is later drafted in for a five-a-side football match, he takes his frustration out on a vicious player. Adam realises he may not be dealing with things as well as he had hoped. Dixie's dad, Arthur, continues to mistake Jeff and Dixie for a couple and tells his daughter he's anxious to see her settled before he dies. Dixie decides she'll give her dad what he wants and asks Jeff to marry her. Note: This is a Holby crossover; for part two, see Holby City series 12 episode 19: "Downstairs, Upstairs". Guest appearance of Elliot Hope (Paul Bradley), Shona (Evelyn Hoskins) & Arthur Dixon (Paul Copley).
711	25	"Past Lives"	Simon Meyers	Paul Logue & Steve Keyworth	20 February 2010	6.85
Staff counsellor Ben Harding gets more than he bargained for from Adam. May is distracted when a handsome stranger turns up in Holby on a motorbike but, when she sees him in cubicles later, she is her usual snooty self. When the stranger reveals himself as Dr Kieron Fletcher, a young research doctor who's hoping to apply for the fellowship, May is seriously unimpressed. Kieron turns out to be a more than capable colleague, but just what is sparking his unusual interest in Jordan? Relaxing after work with a glass of wine, Zoe contacts Jordan to bury the hatchet and offer her full support now that he's head of the ED. But a bottle later, Zoe is horrified to realise that she's left a stream of messages about their relationship on Jordan's answer machine. The next day, fending off the attentions of her admirer, Dr Matt Strong, Zoe is determined to erase the machine before Jordan hears her drunken ramblings. The ED team, especially Alice, are worried about Adam's increasingly erratic behaviour but their concern is only adding to his problems. Reluctantly, Adam attends counselling to talk through his difficulties but, when the counsellor provokes Adam to get a response, the first session doesn't go quite to plan. Note: Guest appearance of Ben Harding (Mark Lethern), Eddie Lanchester, Dean of Medicine (David Mallinson). First appearance of Kieron Fletcher (Robert Boulter) & Matt Strong (Raymond Coulthard).
712	26	"Life Sentence"	Jonathan Fox Bassett	David Bowker	27 February 2010	6.55
A pleasure boat accident brings watery memories back to the surface for Adam; new F2 Keiron pushes his luck with the patients; and Zoe's new admirer gets under Jordan's skin. Despite his colleagues' concern, Adam volunteers to attend with the paramedics when a pleasure boat sinks on a river and, with memories of Jessica and Harry still fresh, dives into the water looking for casualties. It's Kieron's first day and he's desperate to impress Jordan. While dealing with a young diabetic patient who refuses anything other than synthetic insulin, Kieron takes a big risk by covertly administering a normal insulin dose to prevent the girl falling into a coma. Jordan is both furious and admiring. Kieron thinks he's finally starting to make a connection with his clinical lead. Scared of failure, Ruth is hesitant when she is put forward to assist on a new surgical trial but when she impresses her mentor, Howard Fairfax, she decides to pursue her surgical dream once more. Meanwhile, Jordan overhears Matt's persuasive advances towards a disbelieving Zoe; Alice thinks she's made an emotional breakthrough with Adam when he admits that he is finally going to visit Harry's grave for the first time; and Jeff makes a big announcement to a stunned reception and Dixie. Note: First appearance of Howard Fairfax (Michael Maloney).
713	27	"Angel"	Jonathan Fox Bassett	Jeff Povey	6 March 2010	6.23
Yuki's jealousy forces him to take romantic action with May, as the medical drama continues. Jordan, meanwhile, receives a tempting offer from the board and Kieron finally reveals his business with Jordan. With Adam still behaving erratically, Henry approaches Jordan to see if he'd be interested in taking over as clinical lead. Concerned about the effect on Adam's confidence, Jordan is reticent but agrees to a meeting nonetheless. With Zoe covering the F2 bursary interviews, Jordan is set to attend the meeting – until Kieron secretly dismisses his taxi, offering to transport Jordan on his motorbike instead. Driving an increasingly furious Jordan to a remote spot, Kieron is determined to get something off his chest – is this his opportunity to reveal just what his business is with the older doctor? As May continues to flirt with Kieron, Yuki is in turmoil, especially when Lenny tells him that it's only a matter of time before something happens between them and that Yuki should make a move first. Spurred on by his mentor, Zoe, Yuki slips a love note in May's locker but gets more than he bargained for when he finds the F2 exam paper hidden in her bag. Meanwhile, Howard Fairfax and Ruth are concerned when it looks like a patient's health may have deteriorated due to their clinical trial drug and, for once, Zoe rejects Jordan when he offers to spend time with her after a shift.
714	28	"English Beauty"	Ben Caron	Fiona Evans & Jeff Povey	13 March 2010	6.36
Adam's odd behaviour worries Alice, and she tells Jordan she doesn't think he's coping. Jordan asks Alice to talk to Adam because of their common ground. Alice uses her own experiences to try to get Adam to open up over a meal that evening but Adam, desperately trying to feel something, kisses her. Before they head upstairs Alice, herself still vulnerable after Curtis's death, asks Adam to be there in the morning. But Adam feels worse than ever and can't bring himself to spend the night. He slips away. Jay continues to assist Fairfax and Ruth in the surgical trial but, when a patient crashes and dies, the trio are left reeling. Jordan demands an explanation, and Jay confesses that the notes have gone missing. In a private meeting with Fairfax, Ruth questions the trial, but Fairfax tells her that the only way there could have been an error is if Jay drew up an incorrect dosage. Ruth tells Jay he must find the notes in order to clear his name. Kieron tells Jordan he was wrong about his parentage – Jordan's not his father. Jordan is relieved that the matter is settled but, alone, pores over photos of his youth and is alarmed when he realises he did know Kieron's mother. Meanwhile, it's Dixie's hen night, but she is unprepared when she meets the woman of her dreams. May convinces Yuki to keep their relationship under wraps.
715	29	"Just Like a Woman"	Ben Caron	Deborah Jones	27 March 2010	6.67
May's confidence soars when she impresses Jordan with a patient and she realises she's a serious contender for the JAFA. When her patient crashes, May is determined to prove herself and prepares to intubate alone. But as she does, she hears a sickening crack and realises she has broken her patient's neck. Terrified, May covers up her mistake and hides the intubation equipment before Jordan and the crash team arrive. When Jordan, unaware that she has already attempted an intubation unsupervised, offers her the chance to perform the procedure, she declines and passes the opportunity to Yuki. Afterwards, when Yuki realises something's wrong, he runs more tests and discovers the patient's neck is broken. Convinced he is responsible, Yuki confesses to May who advises him to own up to Jordan. She watches as he admits responsibility for a mistake he didn't make. Dixie wakes at Lena's side on the morning of her wedding, but decides to go ahead with the ceremony for the sake of her father. However, at the registry office, Dixie is shocked to see that Lena is the registrar. After learning about Dixie's circumstances, Lena agrees to conduct the ceremony and the pair share a tender goodbye. But Arthur witnesses the kiss and is devastated by his daughter's lies. Elsewhere, Alice is upset when Adam avoids her after their night together and, when he makes an inappropriate remark, flees in tears. However, when Tess warns her to stand up to Adam, Alice tells him their friendship is over. Note: Guest appearance of Arthur Dixon (Paul Copley).
716	30	"Love of a Good Man"	Dominic Leclerc	Martin Jameson	3 April 2010	6.23
It's the day of a very important internal review at the ED, and Ruth finds herself in an impossible situation with one of her colleagues—will career ambitions ride roughshod over the truth? Note: Guest appearance of Monica Shapiro (Stephanie Beacham) and Arthur Dixon (Paul Copley).
717	31	"Loves Me, Loves Me Not"	Dermot Boyd	Sasha Hails	10 April 2010	6.33
A motorbike accident makes Jordan realise that he cares more than he realised about one of his staff. And Zoe receives an interesting offer. Note: Last appearance of Frances Lively (Josette Simon) and guest appearance of Lyn (Liz May Brice).
718	32	"Clean Slate"	Dominic Leclerc	Sonali Bhattacharyya	17 April 2010	6.09
A DNA test proves once and for all whether or not Jordan is Kieron's father and Jay grasps an opportunity to clear his name, as the medical drama continues. Following Kieron's motorcycle accident, Jordan is annoyed to find their situation the subject of gossip in the hospital. After Tess persuades Jordan to visit Kieron, he finds himself thawing towards the young medic but is determined not to become too involved until the DNA results come back. Will the test prove that the two sparring doctors are indeed father and son? Keen to clear his name over the clinical trial incident, Jay comes to the ED to get Tess and Ruth on his side. Ruth avoids him but her suspicions about the safety of the clinical trial are aroused when Fairfax asks her to administer half the usual dosage to a patient . Can she find the missing notes which prove exactly who was at fault all along?Adam spends more time with Lyn and once again enjoys being in the chaotic family atmosphere he so misses. But Lyn becomes suspicious that Adam is only interested in her children and after an angry confrontation she orders him to leave. In an extremely dark mood, Adam drives off into the night. Meanwhile, May is uneasy when she can't get hold of Yuki and pensioner Evelyn is persuaded that she doesn't have to face her medical problems alone.
719	33	"Alone on a Wide, Wide Sea"	Ian Barnes	Daisy Coulam	24 April 2010	6.44
As Adam's erratic behaviour spirals completely out of control, Adam is held at gunpoint, while he is in a suicidal mood due to all his recent bad luck.
720	34	"New Beginnings"	Ian Barnes	Richard Monks & Mark Catley	1 May 2010	6.86
With the police closing in, and Adam fighting for survival he risks his life to save the family, yet the father later dies in the department due to his injuries. Meanwhile in Holby a beekeeper is attacked by and overprotective dad after administering bee stings to his son to treat his arthritis. Kieron owns up to the bronchoscope incident and decides to leave the department and Nick Jordan for good. Zoe decides that her and Matt have no future together and they go their separate ways. Adam frantically searches for Alice only to find she has left Holby, then to his utter disbelief Jessica returns. Note: Departures of Alice Chantery, Kieron Fletcher and Matt Strong
721	35	"A Better Past"	Matthew Evans	Dana Fainaru	8 May 2010	6.31
With Holby ED sent into lock-down after an anthrax scare, the F2s and Charlie fight for their lives. When Yuki is admitted as a patient, May admits her culpability over the broken neck and leaves the department. Meanwhile, Adam and Jessica finally discuss their feelings over Harry's death, but conclude they do not have a future together. Note: Final Appearance of Jessica Harrison (Gillian Kearney) and May Phelps
722	36	"Russian Endings"	Matthew Evans	Paul Logue	15 May 2010	6.10
Jeff, Polly and Dixie attend a call to treat a patient with physiological issues when they discover he has a teenager tied up in his basement. He attacks the team in recess when Kirsty storms in to defuse the situation, with her nonchalant approach. It turns out the reason he kidnapped him is because he had stole his dog, Bruce, and wanted him back. Kirsty goes to find the dog and finds that he is dead. She then assaults the dog murderer and is swiftly reprimanded by Tess. The department is desperate for more funds for the ED, in order for these funds to be released Robert Ludlow shadows the department, after Nick wrongly diagnoses a patient, who goes into arrest and dies Ludlow decides that the funds should still be released pleasing Nick. Yuki returns to the department, lacking confidence due to the May scandal. A father brings in his comatose daughter after claiming she was walking only to find himself diagnosed with TB. After taking bets on why Kirsty left St Marys, kirsty confronts Jay and tells him the story of how all 6 kids from a murder died and she could no longer face St Marys and all the bad memories from there. This makes Jay rethink spending money on his nans house and decides to impress Kirsty by buying her patient a new dog. Nick suffers a blackout which concerns Zoe fearing that the tumour has got worse. Note: First Appearance of Kirsty Clements (Lucy Gaskell) and Robert Ludlow (Alec Newman)
723	37	"Mum's the Word"	Will Sinclair	Mark Cairns	22 May 2010	6.21
Lenny thinks that he's got the JAFA in the bag, as Yuki struggles to cope with the pressure of being back in the department, a fatality strikes when a patient Lenny treated is whisked back into the ED and then dies, placing Lenny back into completion with Yuki. Ruth gets her surgical mojo back while treating a patient with terminal cancer and pushes for an operation which a surgeon has already declined. Zoe is feeling the pressure from Jordan as he suggests them settling down and having children in the 5 years he has left, unbeknown to him that she can't have children. Zoe then decides that she will go through the procedure to cure her infertility with a 25% success rate.
724	38	"In Your Debt"	Paul Murphy	Jason Sutton	5 June 2010	4.00
Shona has been sleeping rough while drinking and getting high and comes to Charlie telling him how she wants to abort the baby only to realise she can't do this and needs to seek social services to which she storms out on. Only to return to the hospital in an ambulance after falling down a flight of stairs trying to kill her baby. Lenny and Yuki are adamant to solve the riddle of the virus killing off the residents. Ruth goes to a surgical convention hosted by Edward Thurlow to read her paper. where she has an embarrassing mishap and pours water over her computer. Her and Edward go out for a meal in a restaurant after he tells her that he is attracted to her. Meanwhile loansharks ransack a man's house who owes them money only to go outside with their loot to find out that he's nicked their van. He searches desperately for his girlfriend Cheryl who later collapses in hospital and crashes due to the mysterious illness. A new line of enquiry comes to light when it turns out that Cheryl had taken part in a drugs trial with Langham Services, ran by Robert Ludlow. A patient takes a shine to Yuki and successfully diagnoses her with MS and is praised by Nick for his observational skills. Zoe starts her treatment to cure her infertility. Note: First Appearance of Edward Thurlow (Stephen Billington)
725	39	"Inconvenient Truths"	Will Sinclair	Rebecca Wojciechowski	12 June 2010	3.02
Charlie manages to secure Shona a job in reception next to noel. Yuki thinks he can explain the crypto cases but is blanked by Nick, Cheryl succumbs to the crypto virus after a week in ITU. Cal, cheryl's boyfriend is brought in intoxicated after being found by Grace who immediately curses Big Mac. Shona is struggling after not being able to deal with the demand of the job and accidentally takes down the computer system causing huge delays. A young girl is brought in after being beaten and her mum who is paranoid comes in to visit fearing the worst, blocking the ambulance bay with her car after having a panic attack. When she goes home she finds that her daughter has murdered the bully with a pair of garden shears, the mother takes the fall for her daughter. Shona purposely lies on the register about the time Grace is brought in and when the power comes on it turns out that Grace is about to breach but the incriminating evidence has disappeared as Shona has hidden the manual check in book. Charlie fires her sending her out on the streets only to once again forgive her and give her a roof to stay under for the night.
726	40	"The Lesser Good"	Richard Platt	Michael Levine	19 June 2010	5.43
Robert is trying to blackmail Nick into keeping the crypto trial away from the authorities to avoid implication. While transporting a category A prisoner, Jackson who has been shanked to the emergency department, the warden is involved in a catastrophic accident causing him major injury. The prisoner takes a great deal of interest into Adams personal life. Mac is still petrified by Graces curse and gets an MRI, blood tests and urine samples, Noel and Jay decide to tell him that the only way to lift the curse is to draw around the whole hospital with chalk with gullible Mac obviously does without asking any questions.
727	41	"Die and Let Live"	Richard Platt	Suzie Smith	26 June 2010	4.97
When Jordan informs him that he could be in mortal danger if he doesn't take the placebo in the drugs trial, Jay is shocked. Jordan promises to fast-track the blood test results, but Jay is aware that the clock is ticking. Treating Eileen, an older lady with diabetes, Jay empathises with her sadness at suffering alone. He is distraught when she dies unexpectedly and, unable to express his fear to his mates (who are running a book on which staff member is at risk) he tries to seek solace with Ruth. But she is too preoccupied to devote time to him. Distracted all day, Ruth receives a mysterious package containing a gold locket. She begs Adam for time off work for personal reasons, leaving the Emergency Department with a garment bag in a chauffeur-driven car. Jay is elated when his test results prove negative. Jordan tells him that he has been given a second chance in life. Jordan also drops into the conversation that Ruth is planning to get married today. Resolving to win her back, Jay races through the streets of Holby to find Ruth at the register office, where he pleads his undying love. Is he in time? Meanwhile, Kirsty gets on the wrong side of Tess when she misguidedly helps a young girl who isn't all she claims to be. Further bad behaviour from Shona leads to Charlie showing her the door – will she be able to appeal to his good nature once more?
728	42	"Going Solo"	Declan O'Dwyer	Jeff Dodds	10 July 2010	5.33
Lenny is determined to track down the last of the drugs trial patients – troubled teen Johnny – and save him from the Crypto virus. After causing an explosion in an office block, wayward Johnny is brought into the ED with his long-suffering mother, Louise, and Lenny leaps on the case. Despite warnings from his colleagues, Lenny performs a complex life-saving procedure unsupervised, much to Jordan's disapproval. But once Johnny's condition has stabilised, can Louise and the ED team get to the bottom of his behavioural problems? Meanwhile, middle-aged Mick is brought into the ED after having a nasty fall and seizures. He has a pacemaker, a secret he's keen to keep from his lively young wife, Emma. Could his determination to keep up with his young partner be compromising his health? And just what is causing those seizures? Charlie makes yet another attempt to reform Shona but, when faced with temptation, Shona buckles and steals from a patient. At his wit's end, Charlie decides to get tough with the teen. Alerting the police, he watches sadly as she's taken away in handcuffs. Elsewhere, unaware that Zoe is reacting badly to the fertility treatment, Jordan assumes she's suffering from morning sickness. When Zoe's pregnancy test comes back negative, she tries to tell Jordan the truth but he's so excited he won't let her finish. Unable to crush his joy, Zoe keeps quiet. But how long can she keep up the pretence?
729	43	"I Am Mine"	Declan O'Dwyer	Jeff Povey	17 July 2010	5.65
Zoe tries to come clean to Jordan, but only digs herself in deeper. Lenny takes desperate measures for evidence of the drugs trial cover-up, and a surprise reunion with a terminally ill Megan leaves Charlie devastated.
730	44	"Making Other Plans"	Simon Meyers	Martin Jameson	24 July 2010	6.05
Adam deals with a traumatic day but finally forgives himself for Harry's death. Tess tries to stop Megan taking drastic action.
731	45	"The Enemy Within"	Rebecca Gatward	Jon Sen	31 July 2010	5.72
Lenny is offered the ultimate bribe. Charlie is forced to choose between his friend and everything he believes in.
732	46	"Nice and Easy Does It"	Declan Eames	Sasha Hails	7 August 2010	5.36
Charlie has agreed to help Megan ease her suffering and steals drugs from the hospital, but Tess discovers his plan and tries to stop him. Pointing out that this goes against everything they, as health professionals, believe in, Tess outlines the other options for controlling Megan's pain and depression, such as home-hospice care. Meanwhile, Megan has bonded with her young healthcare assistant, Lily, who confides she is pregnant but doesn't know who the father is. Determined not to keep the baby to bring it up alone, Lily asks Megan if she'll accompany her to the abortion clinic. When Megan finds out that the cancer has spread to her brain she keeps quiet. In a bid to lift her spirits, Charlie asks Megan what she would do if she had three wishes. Megan would like to go to Las Vegas, drink banana daiquiris and be serenaded by Tom Jones and Frank Sinatra. So Charlie recreates Vegas in her living room and Megan, Charlie, Tess and Lily play roulette, sip cocktails and dance to Megan's favourite crooners. After a wonderful evening, Lily is shocked the next morning to find Megan unconscious in the bath. She is rushed to the ED where her life is saved. Realising that Megan will now need round-the-clock nursing care, Charlie goes to her house to help – but the stubborn nurse is still determined to resist his efforts. When Lily decides to keep her baby after all, Megan is touched but unwavering in her resolution to end her suffering. Will Charlie put his misgivings aside and help out his great friend in her hour of need?
733	47	"What Tonight Means to Me – Part One"	Jonathan Fox Bassett	Tom Bidwell	14 August 2010	6.02
A massive power cut plunges Holby into darkness, as the drugs trial situation comes to a head, and Jordan gets closer to the truth about Zoe's pregnancy. The JAFA fellowship is due to be announced today and, for one doctor, life will change for ever. Lenny is prepared to go through with his deal with Ludlow to be crowned the winner but, oblivious, Yuki writes a preparatory speech recalling why he became a doctor: his brother died of cancer a few years ago and he's wanted to help fix people ever since. But before the fellowship is announced, a major power cut rips across the north of Holby – will the winner collect his reward after all? Meanwhile, Jay helps Jordan with the Crypto case and discovers that one patient has been missed off the list. When Jordan treats Ludlow's daughter after a fall down the stairs during the power cut, he realises that she's suffering from Lupus. Stunned, Jordan realises that all of Ludlow's research has been an attempt to find a cure for her. Profoundly affected by the events of the previous week, Tess confides to Charlie that she'd like to go to the police to confess her part in it. Charlie says he cannot stop her from doing what she feels is right. Will Tess find a way to come to terms with her actions? Zoe continues to lie to Jordan and the rest of the ED about her pregnancy but, after Jordan finds out the truth about Ludlow, he confesses his role in the drugs cover-up to Zoe and tells her they must no longer have any secrets between them. Zoe still doesn't speak up but when Jordan finds fertility drugs in her handbag it looks like her secret may soon be out… This episode saw the return of May Phelps through the use of newly filmed flashbacks.
734	48	"What Tonight Means to Me – Part Two"	Jonathan Fox Bassett	Rob Williams	21 August 2010	4.69
Charlie is about to become a grandfather, Jordan learns the truth about Zoe's pregnancy and Adam celebrates his 40th birthday after a terrible year, as the current series of the medical drama draws to a close. It's still the night of the Ludlow Foundation event and a power cut has struck the north of Holby, plunging the Emergency Department into a state of chaos. When Yuki punches Lenny in the face for a second time, after finding out he's accepted a bribe from Ludlow to be awarded the JAFA fellowship, a fight ensues in the middle of the ED. Called to help break it up, Jordan is quick to work out that Lenny was in cahoots with Ludlow. Shona arrives at the hospital for a check-up in terrible pain – she hasn't felt the baby kick for days. Finding her collapsed on the floor in the dark, Lenny and Yuki put aside their differences to help her out, reviving the baby when it's born not breathing. After being quizzed about her continued use of fertility drugs, Zoe finally confesses to Jordan that she's not pregnant. Jordan is deeply shocked and later impassive when Zoe tells him she loves him in front of the entire department. Will he be able to forgive her? After urging Ludlow to go to the police and confess all, Jordan tells Yuki and Lenny that, despite their good work, there will be no fellowship and no more funding. Will the young doctors ever be able to return to Holby's Emergency Department? It's Adam's 40th birthday and the ED staff throw a surprise party to celebrate. Adam reveals a T-shirt with the slogan "old, free and single" as the team toast Charlie's new grand-daughter – baby Megan – and Tess looks on with a smile. Is this a new beginning for them all? Note: Guest Appearance of Megan Wark

=== Specials ===
Episode	Director	Writer(s)	Original airdate
"The Parting of the Ways"	Adrian Vitoria	David Roden	31 October 2009
8 minute special, available via red button or the Casualty website directly after the broadcast of the regular episode that night. Alistair's world comes crashing down around him.
"Children in Need 2009"	Unknown	Unknown	20 November 2009
A very important patient checks into Holby City Hospital, raising the temperature for the cast of Casualty.
"EastEnders 25th Anniversary"	Unknown	Unknown	19 February 2010
As EastEnders reaches its 25th birthday, Zoe, Tess, Charlie, Ruth and Nick (who is played by Michael French, who played EastEnders character David Wicks) wish the show a happy birthday. This was broadcast on "EastEnders Live: The Aftermath"
"Blue Peter Special"	Unknown	Unknown	10 March 2010
A specially shot scene for Blue Peter featuring host Joel Defries as Dr Mickey Webb, a new doctor who is pranked by Charlie Fairhead and Jay Faldren using the ED starter pack.
