= Casualty series 25 =

Twenty-fifth series of Casualty

Casualty
- Series 25
- Starring: Matt Bardock; William Beck; Charles Dale; Sophia Di Martino; Michael French; Lucy Gaskell; Tristan Gemmill; Hasina Haque; Jane Hazlegrove; Tony Marshall; Steven Miller; Suzanne Packer; Sunetra Sarker; Will Sharpe; Georgia Taylor; Derek Thompson; Christine Tremarco; Ben Turner
- No. of episodes: 47

Release
- Original network: BBC One
- Original release: 4 September 2010 – 6 August 2011

Series chronology
- ← Previous; Series 24 Next → Series 26

The twenty-fifth series of the British medical drama television series Casualty commenced airing in the United Kingdom on BBC One on 4 September 2010 and finished on 6 August 2011. The series featured several crossovers with spin-off show Holby City.

This series has featured the death of Polly Emmerson (Sophia Di Martino), and the departures of Adam Trueman (Tristan Gemmill), Yuki Reid (Will Sharpe), and Kirsty Clements (Lucy Gaskell). This series has welcomed Dylan Keogh (William Beck) and Madiha "Mads" Durrani (Hasina Haque), with the latter departing at the end of the series; and has seen the return of Linda Andrews (Christine Tremarco).

== Cast ==
=== Overview ===
Jaye Jacobs will guest-star as her Holby City character Donna Jackson in the opening episode, as part of Kent's plan to have characters from the two shows cross-over several times a year. While Jacobs has appeared in several Casualty@Holby City episodes, she had never before appeared in Casualty itself, and deemed the two shows very different, to the extent that it felt like "doing a completely different job". In terms of her character's development, Jacobs stated that "Donna really has to put herself on the line in this episode and its not something she's used to doing", explaining that now she has her orphaned niece to care for her priorities have changed: "She's had to accept some responsibility and it's not now just about which man she's going to sleep with next". Guy Henry guest-starred as his Holby City character Henrik Hanssen in episode 24. The character had only recently joined the Holby City cast as the hospital's chief executive officer.

Hasina Haque joined the Casualty cast as new staff nurse, Madiha "Mads" Durrani in episode 1. Mads' storylines included: an attraction to Lenny Lyons and being raped by her taxi driver. She left in the episode 47, the series' finale. Cheryl Campbell joined the cast for ten episodes as the new joint clinical lead, Miriam Turner, in episode 25. Miriam fought against Nick for the sole clinical lead position, which she won. However, she then decided to return the position to Nick and left the show in episode 35. New trust doctor, Dylan Keogh (William Beck) arrived in episode 28 to replace Ruth following her sectioning in episode 21. Ruth returned to the ED as a doctor in episode 45, but Dylan continued to appear. Former Waterloo Road star, Christine Tremarco who guest-starred in the previous series as Jessica Harrison's (Gillian Kearney) friend, Linda Andrews returned to the show in episode 38 as the new clinical nurse manager, replacing Tess Bateman (Suzanne Packer), who returned to her former position as ward sister. However, in the series finale, Linda chooses to resign from clinical nurse manager and accept a staff nurse position with Tess taking the role back from Linda.

The series also saw a number of departures. Junior doctor, Yuki Reid (Will Sharpe), left the show in episode 16 after taking the blame for Lenny and deciding to take a research position in Birmingham. Sophia Di Martino, who plays ambulance technician, Polly Emmerson left the series in January 2011, with Polly's exit scenes airing in episode 34. Polly, who was to leave the following day for a new career path, decided to fix things between Dylan and an unhinged patient. Unfortunately, the patient is armed with scissors and is stabbed. In a tense episode, Polly bleeds to death, leaving the department devastated and Dylan feeling guilty. Lucy Gaskell, who plays Kirsty Clements, became pregnant, but rather than take maternity leave, decided to leave the show. Kirsty's exit aired in episode 46 when a patient encourages her to make a decision about her future and she chooses to leave Holby with daughter, Nita and live in Wales. In the series finale, Adam Trueman (Tristan Gemmill) left after a tough few weeks, marking the end of his four-year stint on the show.

=== Main characters ===
- Matt Bardock as Jeff Collier
- William Beck as Dylan Keogh (from episode 28)
- Charles Dale as Big Mac
- Sophia Di Martino as Polly Emmerson (until episode 34)
- Michael French as Nick Jordan
- Lucy Gaskell as Kirsty Clements (until episode 46)
- Tristan Gemmill as Adam Trueman (until episode 47)
- Hasina Haque as Madiha "Mads" Durrani (episodes 1−47)
- Jane Hazlegrove as Kathleen "Dixie" Dixon
- Tony Marshall as Noel Garcia
- Steven Miller as Lenny Lyons
- Suzanne Packer as Tess Bateman
- Sunetra Sarker as Zoe Hanna
- Will Sharpe as Yuki Reid (until episode 16)
- Georgia Taylor as Ruth Winters
- Derek Thompson as Charlie Fairhead
- Christine Tremarco as Linda Andrews (from episode 38)
- Ben Turner as Jay Faldren

=== Recurring characters ===
- Stephen Billington as Edward Thurlow (until episode 17)
- Tom Chadbon as Henry Williams (until episode 37)
- Holly Earl as Nita Clements (episodes 7−46)
- Stephen Lord as Warren Clements (episodes 7−25 and 33)

=== Guest characters ===
- Cheryl Campbell as Miriam Turner (episodes 25−35)
- Michelle Collins as Camille Lewis (episodes 1−7)
- Guy Henry as Henrik Hanssen (episodes 24, 25, 29, 34 and 35)
- Jaye Jacobs as Donna Jackson (episode 1)
- Travis Oliver as James Molloy (episodes 8, 11 and 17)

== Crew ==
For Series 25, Oliver Kent continued in his ongoing role as the show's Series Producer with Belinda Campbell continuing as the show's Executive Producer until Episode 45. Johnathan Young, former Executive Producer of The Bill, took over as Executive Producer from the final two episodes of the show (Episodes 46-47). Mark Catley, the show's writer, continued as the show's Consultant Producer.

For this series, the storylines were written by four of the show's writers: Ellen Taylor wrote the storylines for episodes 1-11; Paul Logue (Episodes 12-22), Sasha Hails (Episodes 23-35) & Hamish Wright (Episode 36-47). There was no Story Producer credited for this series.

== Episodes ==
No. overall	No. in series	Title	Directed by	Written by	Original release date	UK viewers (millions)
735	1	"Entry Wounds"	Paul Murphy	Mark Catley	4 September 2010	5.97
In a feature-length episode, Tess requests support staff for the busy emergency department, and is assisted by ward sister Donna Jackson (Jaye Jacobs) and new nurse Mads (Hasina Haque), who has difficulty understanding the local accents, especially Scottish Lenny. Jeff and Dixie treat a patient with a gunshot wound to the arm. When a jogger is admitted who has been shot with ball-bearings from an air rifle, the staff are concerned that the shootings are linked. Lenny attempts to convince a police sergeant, Jack (Michael Higgs) of the link, but is dismissed until a third victim dies from their injuries. The shooter is located to Holby College, and the department is overrun by victims and their parents, including Simone (Jayne Wisener) and her mother Camille (Michelle Collins). With leadership from Adam (Tristan Gemmill) and Charlie (Derek Thompson), the staff manage to cope, until the revelation that one of the shooters is inside the department.
736	2	"The Blame Game"	Ian Barnes	Daisy Coulam	11 September 2010	5.08
The department comes under public and media scrutiny following the shooting incident. With patients refusing treatment, the hospital board require an explanation and Nick (Michael French) tries to find someone to blame. Ruth (Georgia Taylor) anticipates the announcement of staffing for a new surgical position she has applied for, believing that her new husband, Edward, will have helped her attain the job. The staff treat a war veteran and young boy with wounds caused by the explosion of a hand grenade. The boy pulls the pin on a second grenade, and the ED is evacuated of everyone but the two of them and Charlie.
737	3	"Chaos Theory"	Ian Barnes	Tom MacRae & Mark Catley	18 September 2010	5.42
Nick instigates a two-hour rule for patients treated in the department, much to the chagrin of the staff. A schoolboy is admitted following a fall while on LSD, followed by fourteen more students with the same symptoms. Simone is re-admitted after falling down the stairs, and nurse Kirsty suspects a psychological problem. Camille dismisses her concerns and is angry with her treatment, causing her to confront Nick about his staff's behaviour. Ruth attempts to seduce Edward, troubled by their lack of intimacy.
738	4	"Only the Lonely" (Note: See also "Only the Lonely" series 9, "Only the Lonely" series 16 & "Only the Lonely" series 28)	Matthew Evans	Sasha Hails	25 September 2010	5.44
Jordan's new unit opens for business. Yuki and Mads finds that they make a good team. Ruth's marriage problems with Edward continue.
739	5	"Into the Fog"	Matthew Evans	Nicola Wilson	2 October 2010	5.77
The Department has its cleanliness inspection. Lenny is late for work again much to Jordan's anger but when another negative story hits the newspapers, Lenny discovers that his girlfriend is not who she says she is. Yuki realises that Adam has misdiagnosed one of his patients.
740	6	"Eliminate the Negative"	Declan O'Dwyer	Sally Abbott	9 October 2010	5.02
Jeff is about to be given an award for his actions during the shooting at the college but when he then comes to blows with patient his behaviour is called into question. Kirsty clashes with Simone's mother when she is brought back into the department. Jordan's questionnaire brings out some surprising results.
741	7	"Reasons Unknown"	Will Sinclair	Dana Fainaru	16 October 2010	4.68
Jeff and Simone face their demons as the truth about the shooting at the college emerges. Kirsty's domestic situation does not appear to be what it seems. Jordan, Adam and Henry attend a memorial service for the shooting victims.
742	8	"Employee of the Week"	Declan O'Dwyer	Hamish Wright	23 October 2010	5.17
Baby Megan is abandoned into Charlie's care. Ruth's plan to improve the department leads to fall outs among the staff and as Jay and Polly grow closer, Charlie makes a discovery which could put Ruth's marriage to Edward on the line.
743	9	"No Place Like Home"	Dermot Boyd	Suzie Smith	30 October 2010	5.14
An Inspection looms at the department. Kirsty's domestic situation worsens when she collapses from a drug overdose. Zoe advises Mads to keep her head down if she wants to fit in with the department.
744	10	"Hands On"	Dermot Boyd	Ellen Taylor	6 November 2010	5.16
The day of the inspection on the department dawns. Jay and Ruth are forced to lie to Jay's grandmother when she is rushed into the ED, but are caught out by the disapproving inspector. With all the staff tied up in operations, Jordan is forced to go against protocol and operate even through he is not supposed to.
745	11	"The Enemy Within"	Matthew Evans	Rachel Flowerday	13 November 2010	4.88
Ruth finds out that Charlie was aware of Edward's affair, and has him transferred out of the department. Kirsty's working day is disrupted by her husband's mind games. Suffering from ME, Warren hides Kirsty's car keys to try to keep her off work. Polly and Jay's romance hits the rocks.
746	12	"Guilty Secrets"	Sunetra Sarker & Suzanne Packer	David Bowker	20 November 2010	5.40
The gang confront Ruth about her decision to make Charlie a victim of budget cuts, but she refuses to reinstate him. Lenny visits a woman named Helen and discovers that she is his sister but he then finds that she needs a bone marrow transplant and wants him to be a donor.
747	13	"Truth Will Out"	Steve Brett	Tahsin Güner	27 November 2010	5.64
Kirsty's husband and daughter are rushed into the department following a car crash. The ED is thrown into disarray by a patient-flow advisor.
748	14	"Grandiosity"	Steve Brett	Marston Bloom	4 December 2010	5.34
Ruth takes pleasure in revealing the results of a time and motion study but when she then plans a trip to the races in order to boost morale, she is sidelined yet again. Lenny introduces his sister to the gang but is forced to face feelings he would rather not face. Jeff returns to work.
749	15	"What Lies Beneath"	Reza Moradi	Kim Revill	11 December 2010	5.22
Jeff takes the law into his own hands. Mads becomes torn between her own beliefs and the department's. Lenny discovers he is not a suitable donor match for his sister.
750	16	"Season of Goodwill"	Reza Moardi	Dana Fainaru	18 December 2010	7.37
Jordan returns and goes head to head with Ruth over her policies. Lenny and Yuki go to extreme lengths to find a donor for Lenny's sister. When Ruth finds out, Yuki takes the blame and departs to take a research position in Birmingham. Warren's violent colours come back to the boil when he reads a text that Kirsty has sent to Adam.
751	17	"Winter Wonderland"	Declan O'Dwyer	Daisy Coulam	27 December 2010	4.04
Ruth's sham marriage to Edward continues but when she and his lover James are forced to work together, they clash which leads to a fatal drugs mishap. Kirsty continues to struggle to work with Adam, and Mads and Noel host a Christmas party for all the patients in the ED.
752	18	"All the Time in the World"	Declan O'Dwyer	David Bowker	2 January 2011	6.95
Jordan's decision to get behind the wheel despite being banned leads to a fatal car accident. 2011 gets off to a terrible start for Ruth when she loses a patient on the stroke of midnight and falsely accuses Mads of making a mistake, potentially losing friendship in the process.
753	19	"Epiphany"	Ed Bazalgette	Paul Logue & Deborah Jones	8 January 2011	6.89
Adam uncovers Kirsty's secret but will it come too late to prevent another confrontation with Warren? Jordan is held hostage in a disused warehouse at knife point. Tess worries about Ruth's continued downward spiral when she becomes obsessed with a missing audit book.
754	20	"Altered States"	Ed Bazalgette	Jason Sutton & Rachel Flowerday	15 January 2011	6.67
Jay is worried about Ruth when she has flashbacks from her night out clubbing which to the possibility that Ruth may have been raped by the man who Lenny thought was being abused by his wife but is everything as it seems? Jay seeks advice from Charlie Jordan's surgical dreams come true but who will bring Ruth into line now?
755	21	"Choose Your Illusion"	Declan Eames	Rob Williams	22 January 2011	6.89
Zoe is forced to call Jordan out of a prestigious operation when Ruth finally reaches crisis point when she tries to illegally operate on a patient named Katy who was brought in by Jeff and Dixie but can Jordan and Zoe stop Ruth in the nick of time and what will the consequences be for Ruth? It is Warren and Kirsty's anniversary but their domestic situation finally reaches flash point with disastrous results.
756	22	"A Lion Roars"	Declan Eames	Sally Tatchell	29 January 2011	6.91
The Team deal with the aftermath of Ruth's actions the previous week but when Jordan tries to give a rallying pep talk, it does not go down well leaving Jordan to pick up the pieces. Kirsty's situation finally comes to a head when she makes plans to flee Holby but when she is caught out events reach a climax leading Adam to find Warren at the bottom of the stairs. Jordan, Adam and Tess attempt to save a baby who has been given methadone.
757	23	"Place of Safety"	Paul Murphy	Dana Fainaru	5 February 2011	6.78
Following Ruth's sectioning to a mental health institution a couple of weeks ago, Ruth wakes up in a sparse room and lashes out at Charlie when he tries to help her. Through the use of flashbacks the events leading up to Ruth's sectioning are recalled, but just who is Mary and does she hold the key to Ruth's recovery?
758	24	"Duty of Care" (Note: See also "Duty of Care" series 9 & "Duty of Care" series 26)	Paul Murphy	Jon Sen	12 February 2011	6.79
In a crossover with Holby City Jordan goes head-to-head with Henrik Hansen over a patient's treatment. Mads makes a complaint against Lenny when he unwittingly offends her. Jay struggles work and caring for his gran's declining health.
759	25	"Till Death Us Do Part"	Jon Sen	Julia Gilbert	19 February 2011	6.97
Having been found at the bottom of the stairs a few weeks ago, Warren wakes up from his coma but when he finds out that Kirsty wants to leave him for Adam, a final showdown ensues, causing Kirsty to flee but will she live to regret her decision? Jordan is shocked when his old mentor, Miriam Turner (Cheryl Campbell) starts work as the new joint clinical lead. Jay makes a shock discovery about his health.
760	26	"Boys Will Be Boys"	Ben Gutteridge	Philip Gawthorne	26 February 2011	6.60
Adam and Kirsty receive an unwelcome visit from the police who are investigating Warren's accident. Jay confides in Miriam about his health problems but will she persuade him to see a doctor? Kirsty's actions soon come back to haunt her when she slaps Nita and the girl ends up going missing.
761	27	"Less Than Zero"	David O'Neill	Jeff Povey	5 March 2011	6.75
Kirsty is out of her mind with worry after Nita disappears but when she is injured following a fall and arrives at the hospital, Adam makes a shock discovery. In the aftermath of his health scare, Jay realizes that he's going to have to get his grandmother full time care. Mads and Lenny deal with a very unusual bomber
762	28	"Only Human"	David O'Neill	Lauren Klee	12 March 2011	6.69
Jay finds out that he does indeed have cancer and is tearfully forced to tell his grandmother she's going into a care home. Dylan Keogh (William Beck) makes an interesting start at the ED when he annoys and delights Jordan in equal measure! Ruth escapes from the psychiatric ward in order to go shopping but when Charlie finds out she hasn't been taking her medication, can he stop her from getting arrested?
763	29	"Secrets and Lies"	Matthew Evans	Marston Bloom	26 March 2011	6.27
Jay deals with a drug trafficker and his girlfriend in the ED, hours before his operation to remove his cancerous tumour. Miriam and Jordan declare war on each other, leading Hanssen to suggest that they both apply for a single clinical lead post. Noel organises a night at the bowling alley and after confiding in Zoe, Mads accepts Lenny's invitation to go on a date.
764	30	"Just Because You're Paranoid"	Matthew Evans	Rachel Flowerday	2 April 2011	6.29
Ruth's recovery from her problems finally turns the corner when she treats a fellow patient and discovers that she's suffering from Lymes disease. Dylan rubs most of the staff in the ED the wrong way with his know-it-all attitude but Zoe soon softens when his persistence over a course of treatment with a patient pays off in spite of him nearly being sued. Ruth's astonished to discover that her old mentor Sarah Evans is a fellow patient in the Psych ward but a meeting between the pair goes wrong when Ruth discovers Charlie's deceit.
765	31	"Starting Over"	Will Sinclair	Tim Price	9 April 2011	5.67
Jay returns from his operation to remove his cancer but things continue to go downhill when his grandmother is rushed into the ED following a fall at the care home but his strange behaviour makes her suspicious. As Mads heads out of the country for her brother's wedding in Pakistan, she and Lenny discover that the path to true love does not run smoothly. Polly decides she wants a career change from paramedic to counsellor.
766	32	"A Real Shame"	Will Sinclair	Shazia Rashid & Rachel Flowerday	16 April 2011	5.32
As Jay waits for his results to come through he receives a phone call from a fuming Charlie who wants to know why he hasn't visited Ruth recently and when he does visit her he can't bring himself to tell her the truth about his cancer. He then with Miriam's help opens the results and is delighted to find out that he's in the clear. Jordan and Miriam's war continues as the board finally decides who will be the sole clinical lead but who will come out on top-Miriam or Jordan
767	33	"Before the Fall"	Rebecca Gatward	Suzie Smith	23 April 2011	5.27
Kirsty visits a fire station which is holding a ceremony in Warren's memory but when Nita climbs the tower with a bottle of vodka in hand, the truth about their family history and Warren's death are finally revealed (via flashbacks). Polly's attempt's to heal the rift between Dylan and an unstable patient backfires badly when the patient grabs a pair of scissors with tragic consequences.
768	34	"Momentum"	Richard Platt	Paul Logue	30 April 2011	5.51
In this special real time episode, Polly's life is on the line after being stabbed and locked in the basement of the ED and as Dylan finds her phone in a patient's cubicle, the patient pulls the blooded knife at him. Meanwhile Jay and his colleagues begin a search for Polly but will they find her before she bleeds to death and will Jordan's career prospects suffer as a result when he's left to carry the can? Meanwhile Miriam finds out that she has got the single clinical lead post.
769	35	"Deception"	Richard Platt	Sally Tatchell	7 May 2011	5.67
In his last shift as Joint Clinical Lead, Jordan is forced to deal with the aftermath of Polly's death the previous week and the staff attempt to keep things together for the sake of the patients. Meanwhile Jordan discovers an 8 year old boy in the hospital who turns out to be Miriam's grandson who is left with a tough choice-her family or her career?
770	36	"A Quiet Life"	Paul Murphy	Pete Hambly	21 May 2011	5.55
An administration error sees the life of a young boy hanging in the balance and leads to Adam and Tess clashing but should they be pulling together in a time of crisis? Lenny is shocked when Mads reveals that she's engaged but when she and Lenny come close to kissing and she then hails a taxi, has she made a decision that she will regret? Ruth (with Charlie's support) makes a surprise return to the department but during all the chaos, will she fail at the first hurdle?
771	37	"When the Bough Breaks"	Paul Murphy	Sasha Hails	28 May 2011	4.85
Tess treats a teenage patient who used to be friends with her son and when it is revealed that he cannot have a new liver due to his drinking Tess takes drastic action but when Henry finds out and forces her to take the blame for another patient's death, she refuses and makes a stand against bureaucracy but will the rest of the department support her?
772	38	"The Gift of Life"	Ian Barnes	Daisy Coulam	4 June 2011	5.02
Following Tess's decision to resign the previous week Linda Andrews (Christine Tremarco) who is a friend of Adam's former wife joins the overworked staff at the department. Mads is confronted by the man who forced himself on her in a taxi but will she report the incident to the police in the wake of his behaviour.
773	39	"One Good Day"	Susie Watson	Tim Baker	11 June 2011	5.65
Linda struggles to get the team on-side on her first as clinical nurse manager and she is shocked when her one night stand turns up at the hospital with a bombshell. Dylan returns to the hospital for the first time since Polly's death and ends up helping to solve a mysterious patient case.
774	40	"Keep on Running – Part One"	Reza Moradi	David Bowker	18 June 2011	5.91
In the first of a two part-story, Adam is worried that he is becoming too detached from his patients and tries to give a patient with terminal cancer a dignified death at home but incurs Jordan's wrath in the process. Dixie has reservations when Jeff agrees to let Karl Fontayne shadow them and her fears soon prove correct when Karl's friend turns up at the ED and trouble soon brews.
775	41	"Keep on Running – Part Two"	Reza Moradi	Julia Gilbert	25 June 2011	6.01
Tess and Linda clash over Linda's management style. Later, Linda misjudges a grieving patient which feigns illness for attention, but fails to realise he is actually seriously ill. Ruth is officially reinstated but when a stroke victim is brought in her confidence wavers and she realises that she has pushed herself too far. Jeff and Karl finally begin to resolve their problems over Polly's death.
776	42	"Rogue"	Tim Leandro	Hamish Wright	2 July 2011	5.64
Adam tries to bypass hospital rules in order to help a known sex-offender who is admitted into the ED following a beating. Meanwhile, Mads is horrified to learn that her new friend is married to her attacker Ash, while Linda and Jordan clash over the hospital's budget but she finds help from an unexpected source – Jordan's PA.
777	43	"Divine Intervention"	Tim Leandro	Stephen McAteer	9 July 2011	5.78
Adam finds himself in a battle of wills between a man trying to prevent his brother from testifying in court and then the law when he tries to serve moral justice. Dylan begins to get bored of the Clinical Decision Unit but is shocked when a patient turns up on his doorstep wanting a place to stay.
778	44	"Pascal's Wager"	Reza Moradi	Michael Levine	16 July 2011	6.18
A couple who run a pharmacy take dramatic action against a heroin addict who has been terrorising them with shocking consequences. Jordan is furious when he finds out that the girl that Dylan lent a bed to is underage. A terrifed Mads continues to live in fear of her attacker Ash but can Lenny persuade her to go to the police?
779	45	"System Error"	Reza Moradi	Paul Logue	23 July 2011	5.83
Adam's moralistic attitude leads to him clashing with Kirsty which ends with the truth about Warren's abuse being revealed to the entire staff in the department. Jordan allows Ruth to return to the department on a probationary period but her first day is anything but easy.
780	46	"When You're Smiling"	Simon Meyers	Marston Bloom	30 July 2011	5.69
Adam finds himself under investigation from Jordan as his past medical errors finally begin to catch up with him after a paedophile is admitted into the hospital. Mads helps to mend the rift between a father and son. Kirsty is given the courage to make a drastic decision about her future by a patient and decides to leave the hospital.
781	47	"Thanks For Today"	Paul Murphy	Rachel Flowerday	6 August 2011	6.09
In the last episode of the series, An explosion rocks Holby Airport leaving the entire department stretched to the limit. When Mads finds out that her rapist was one of the victims, will the truth about her attack finally be revealed to the department? Jordan finds out about Adam's illegal actions but is stopped from taking action due to all the chaos. Adam departs from the hospital.

== Critical response ==
The series premiere was selected as recommended viewing by What's on TV, who deemed the episode "compelling". Jane Rackham of the Radio Times praised the episode, advising viewers not to be deterred by the "choppy editing" and hand-held camerawork, commenting that it ultimately "meshes together rather well." Rackham's only complaint was the unprofessional behaviour exhibited by Lenny, which she felt "beggar[ed] belief at times".
