= Kirsty Clements =

Fictional character from the BBC medical drama Casualty

- Casualty character
- Lucy Gaskell as Kirsty Clements
- First appearance: "Russian Endings"; 15 May 2010
- Last appearance: "When You're Smiling"; 30 July 2011
- Portrayed by: Lucy Gaskell

In-universe information
- Occupation: Staff nurse
- Spouse: Warren Clements (until 2011)
- Children: Nita Clements (daughter)

Kirsty Clements is a fictional character from the BBC medical drama Casualty, played by Lucy Gaskell. She first appeared in the twenty-fourth series episode "Russian Endings", broadcast on 15 May 2010. Kirsty is a staff nurse in Holby City Hospital's emergency department (ED). Gaskell was invited to audition by show producers and was successful. She shadowed ED nurses at a local hospital as preparation for the role. Kirsty is characterised as a strong, independent and feisty nurse, who does the best for her patients. She develops close friendships with her colleagues, notably Adam Trueman (Tristan Gemmill), although Kirsty's brash personality also makes her clash with others.

The character's backstory and home life was explored, with her husband, Warren Clements (Stephen Lord), and daughter, Nita Clements (Holly Earl), introduced. Kirsty is central to an issue-led domestic violence storyline, in which Warren abuses Kirsty. Gaskell wanted to raise awareness for the issue and portray several aspects of the storyline. She researched the story by speaking to domestic abuse victims. The story climaxes when Warren dies after a confrontation between him, Kirsty and Nita. Gaskell quit her role after a year of filming with the show and Kirsty departs in the twenty-fifth series episode "When You're Smiling", broadcast on 30 July 2011.

== Casting ==
On 18 March 2010, it was announced that actress Lucy Gaskell had joined the show's cast as "fiery and vivacious mental health nurse" Kirsty Clements. Gaskell described the experience as "a great big whirlwind" and said the cast and crew were welcoming towards her. Series producer, Oliver Kent, expressed his delight at Gaskell's casting, commenting that she will be good for creating the character of Kirsty.

Gaskell previously guest starred in Casualty's sister show, Holby City, for one episode as a heavily pregnant woman. She recalled that she was required to do "a lot of pushing, screaming and throwing up". Belinda Campbell, the show's executive producer, requested that Gaskell audition for the role, which she did. At the audition, Gaskell was informed about the character's storylines and how producers wanted to handle the story, which encouraged to pursue the role. The following day, she was offered the job; Gaskell preferred the short wait between auditioning and being offered the role as she found it "the worst part of being an actress". Gaskell immediately notified her mother of her new role, before informing her friend, actress Georgia Taylor, who portrays Ruth Winters in the serial. In preparation for the role, Gaskell shadowed nurses at the emergency department (ED) of Frenchay Hospital, South Gloucestershire. The actress wore medical scrubs while in the hospital's ED which confused patients as they presumed she was a hospital nurse. She enjoyed shadowing the nurses and felt she learnt a lot from the experience.

== Development ==
=== Characterisation ===
Kirsty is a force of nature. She doesn't hide her light under a bushel – she'll make her diagnosis – even if it means undermining a doctor's authority. Highly trained, and highly skilled, she can diagnose as well as the F2's. Even better at times.

— BBC Online.

Kirsty was billed as a brilliant nurse who provides "a breath of fresh air" and "a bucket full of attitude" to the ED. BBC also said Kirsty would arrive with a "dirty laugh", a "disregard for authority" and "loyalty to her patients". Kent described Kirsty as a "human whirlwind". Gaskell named Kirsty the ideal friend who is "fun, game for a laugh and a joke with her colleagues". Kirsty is a staff nurse who was promoted to senior staff nurse in a different hospital due to her "skill, determination and hard work ethic". The actress explained that Kirsty's flaw is putting other people before herself and a need to "make a difference". She called "a strong, confident person" who is "actually rather sensitive and vulnerable", which Gaskell believes she can relate to.

Kirsty forms good relationships with others, but Gaskell said that the character will defend herself and others if she believes they are not being treated fairly. Gaskell told David Collins of TV Choice that Kirsty is a "very forgiving person". The actress said that in work, Kirsty is a "strong, capable woman" who can defend others whereas at home, Kirsty is different; she is "submissive to her domineering husband". Kirsty's backstory states that she married her "childhood sweetheart" Warren Clements (Stephen Lord) and became pregnant at sixteen with their only child, daughter Nita Clements (Holly Earl).

=== Friendships ===
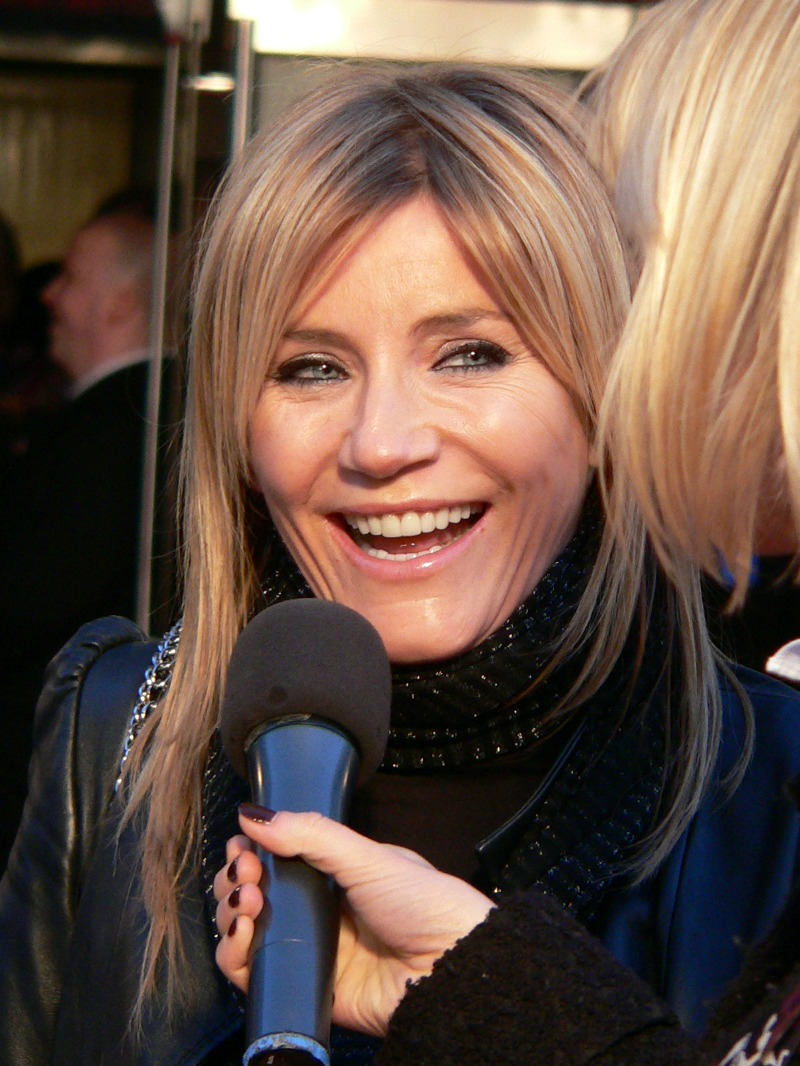
Kirsty grows close to consultant Adam Trueman after she helps a patient, played by Michelle Collins (pictured).

Upon her arrival, Kirsty develops good relationships with most of her colleagues, particularly her male colleagues and ED consultant Zoe Hanna (Sunetra Sarker). She impresses ED consultant Adam Trueman, portrayed by Tristan Gemmill, when she helps a grieving patient (Michelle Collins) tackle her grief. Gaskell revealed that Kirsty finds Adam attractive since he is "quite different" to Warren. Kirsty later shares a one-off kiss with Adam and Gaskell pointed out that a mutual attraction has grown between the pair. Gaskell later revealed in an interview with Sarah Ellis of Inside Soap that Kirsty would not begin a relationship with Adam as she is "not ready" for a relationship following the end of her marriage to Warren. The pair fall out in July 2011 after Adam questions Kirsty's abilities to work. However, Kirsty and Adam reconcile before she departs and Kirsty warns Adam that he needs to change his attitude, which he decides he will do. Gaskell noted that the characters did not get the opportunity to pair romantically, but opined that if they did, they would have made "a great couple".

Kirsty's bold personality results in her often clashing with other members of the ED staff. She clashes with senior nurse Tess Bateman (Suzanne Packer). Gaskell pointed out that their "different nursing styles" led to them sharing conflicting views. On one occasion, Tess warns Kirsty after over-involving herself with a patient. Gaskell explained this "frustrates" her character as she "passionately believes in going that extra mile for a patient if it means it will help them outside of the ED." Kirsty later clashes with Tess again over patient care, but they reconcile when Kirsty requires Tess' help after injuring herself.

Similarly, Kirsty clashes with ED doctor Ruth Winters and they share some "fairly fractious" scenes although Gaskell and Taylor knew each other from school and enjoyed filming together. Gaskell was pleased to work with Taylor again as it "feels like the most natural thing in the world." When Shona Wark (Evelyn Hoskins) is assigned to work on reception but vanishes from her post, Kirsty challenges her and later finds her car has been vandalised by Shona.

=== Home life and domestic abuse ===
In June 2010, Kent revealed that Kirsty's home life would be explored. Lord's casting in the role of Kirsty's husband, Warren, was announced shortly afterwards; the character was billed as "dark and brooding". On Lord's casting, Kent commented, "We're going to see some really powerful stuff from him and Lucy Gaskell". Lord enjoyed working with Gaskell and hoped to work with her again in the future. Warren is a former firefighter who can no longer work due to a medical condition, which makes him frustrated. Having married Kirsty at a young age, he struggled to cope with their marriage and having a child. Lord explained that Warren "genuinely loves" Nita and desires a relationship with Kirsty, but is "fighting a losing battle with himself and others". He also pointed out that Warren has "an explosive temper" and can be "extremely manipulative", stemming from how little pride he has. Gaskell mentioned that Warren would be introduced in the show's twenty-fifth series, and he made his first appearance in the episode "Reasons Unknown", broadcast on 16 October 2010. During Warren's first appearance, Kirsty's home life is portrayed as "miserable" due to her unstable relationship with Warren, and Helen Childs of Inside Soap realised that to Kirsty, the ED is "a refuge" from her home life. Gaskell pointed out that Kirsty enjoys her job because she has an unpleasant home life.

Producers used a "slow-burn" approach for the storytelling of Kirsty's domestic abuse plot, which Gaskell liked. She enjoyed the hidden hints in the build-up to the storyline and preferred this approach rather than "wrapping it up in a few weeks". Gaskell pointed out that there was "quite a big mystery" with Kirsty following her arrival, which added to the slow-burn approach. The actress found the storyline emotionally challenging and admitted that she struggled to "detach herself" from the role after work. She found the storyline "tiring" and said she and Lord became "emotional" about the story as they wanted to portray it correctly. Gaskell and producers worked together to display that domestic abuse often occurs with "strong and feisty women", which she initially found surprising. Gaskell wanted to portray all elements of the domestic abuse rather than focusing on the violence. She commented, "We were keen to show the steady build up, the subtle emotional abuse that’s sometimes harder to identify, and also show the aftereffects of abuse." The actress praised show producers and researchers for their handling of the storyline. Gaskell prepared for the storyline by researching the role and contacting domestic abuse charity, Women's Aid. She visited the charity's call centre in Bristol and discovered the help they offer to victims of abuse. The actress also visited a refuge in London, where she spoke to various women who informed Gaskell of their stories. Gaskell called the women "inspiring" and is "incredibly grateful" towards them for their support. The actress wanted Kirsty's storyline to raise awareness for domestic violence as she felt it was an issue not publicised enough. She commented, "If this storyline has helped even one person, then we've done our job."

Struggling to sleep at home, Kirsty takes diazepam before receiving a call from work informing her she is late. She rushes to get into work, which is challenging for Kirsty. Struggling to stay awake, Kirsty "tricks" Adam into prescribing her Ritalin although it has a negative effect on her body and she collapses. She is discovered by nurse Madiha Dhurani (Hasina Haque) and Adam, who Gaskell described as Kirsty's "knight in shining scrubs". Adam saves Kirsty, but hides her until she regains consciousness. When she awakens, Adam tries to talk to Kirsty, but she is hesitant to speak to him. Gaskell explained that while Kirsty is not yet prepared to speak to Adam, she will "start to crack". Warren and Nita are later involved in a car crash, but when medics arrive at the scene, they cannot find Nita, although Adam eventually finds her. Kirsty is "really shocked and annoyed" with Warren for driving as he struggles to walk. Gaskell admitted that Kirsty feels "uncomfortable" and "awkward" in both Warren and Adam's company following a kiss she shared with Adam. Warren begins to "manipulate" his living situation and suggests he has myalgic encephalomyelitis. Gaskell said that Kirsty is "sceptical" about the suggestion as she is worried that he is governing her using "mind games". On why Kirsty stays with Warren, Gaskell explained that there were many reasons, which the audience would soon discover.

"[That is] a frustrating question for an abuse victim to be asked. The question should be 'Why doesn’t he stop hitting her?' There are so many reasons why people stay in an abusive relationship. In Kirsty's case, it's been because of her daughter Nita, Warren's illness and because she found ways to justify the violence."

—Gaskell on why Kirsty remains together with Warren. (2011)

When Kirsty discovers Warren may have muscular dystrophy, she begins to lose concentration at work. Struggling, Kirsty shares a "tender moment" with Adam, and at home, Warren realises Adam has texted Kirsty so attacks her. A bruised Kirsty later arrives in the ED, worrying Adam, who questions how she received the bruises. Kirsty claims they appeared after playing with Nita, but she has an X-ray so she can discover the extent of her bruising. Adam reviews the results and discovers several injuries. Kirsty then admits that she is being abused by Warren, who attacks Kirsty when they return home. When Warren attacks Kirsty again, she is left bloodied and flees to Adam's house. Kirsty decides to leave Warren in the wake of her attack, accepting she is a "victim" and admitting to Nita that she is frightened of Warren. Gaskell stated that this is "a real wake-up call" for Kirsty, who briefly considers staying with Adam until she realises Warren would look for her there, endangering her and Nita. Kirsty decides to leave Holby and Gaskell stated that Kirsty believes Warren would "kill her" if he found her. Adam realises that Kirsty is leaving, which she confirms, before leaving Adam a "hurriedly written" note and returning home. As she packs her belongings, Warren returns and confronts Kirsty. Gaskell explained that when Warren finds Kirsty, he becomes "scared" that he may lose control so grows "increasingly violent", which the actress said is "the most dangerous time" for Kirsty. Kirsty and Warren argue and when Adam arrives at the house, he discovers an unconscious Warren at the bottom of the staircase.

Following his fall, Warren is left comatose while Kirsty remains at his bedside, hoping he will die. Gaskell explained that Kirsty is "terrified" that Warren will murder her if he regains consciousness. When Warren's mother, Cathy (Mary Jo Randle), arrives at the hospital, Kirsty reveals that Warren is abusing her and is horrified when Cathy is unsurprised, causing them to argue. When Warren awakes from the coma, Kirsty becomes worried and alerts Adam, which Cathy tells Warren. He becomes enraged and confronts Adam, warning him to stay away from Kirsty. Warren becomes exhausted and punches Kirsty, appalling Kirsty who leaves with Nita. However, after Kirsty leaves, Warren is admitted to resus with deep vein thrombosis. In resus, Warren dies. Following Warren's death, Adam comforts Kirsty who later has an argument with Nita, before discovering her daughter has run away. Kirsty struggles following Nita's disappearances and when a teenage girl is admitted to the ED and later dies, Kirsty "fears the worst". The girl is confirmed not to be Nita and she is later admitted to the ED, much to Kirsty's relief. When Adam questions Nita, the teenager reveals she caused her father's death.

Kirsty discovers Nita's secret in late April 2011 after attending a ceremony honouring Warren. Having heard Warren's former colleague describe him as "wonderful and courageous", Nita becomes "confused" and absconds. When Kirsty finds her, they begin to reminisce about Warren and discuss the impact he had on their lives. After they comfort each other, Nita confesses that she pushed Warren down the stairs. Producers used flashbacks to reveal that Warren's attack on Kirsty caused her to lose consciousness and while she was unconscious, Nita pushed Warren, causing him to fall down the stairs. Gaskell explained that Kirsty presumed that Warren had fallen as she "never" considered that Nita could be responsible. On Kirsty's feelings towards Nita's attack, Gaskell commented, "She's not angry — just guilty that Nita resorted to this. Kirsty blames herself." Nita's confession was filmed in late December 2010 on a swaying tower situated 50 feet above ground while weather conditions were bad. Gaskell found the experience "scary" and noted that the show's continuity team struggled because it occasionally snowed while filming the scenes.

=== Departure ===
"You see someone who has been controlled in this way suddenly take full control of her life. She met Warren when she was young — she was 17 — so this is the first time Kirsty has said, 'I don’t have to do this every day, I can do whatever I want to do.' It’s the most liberating day of Kirsty’s life. So she picks up her daughter Nita, and they drive off to a happy new start."

—Gaskell on why Kirsty decides to leave Holby. (2011)

Gaskell decided to quit her role after a year of filming with the show. After informing producers of her decision, the actress discovered she was pregnant, which she described as "fantastic timing". Gaskell confirmed that producers had left the door open for a potential return and said that she is "really sad" to leave the serial. The actress spoke with producers "a lot" about the character's exit, and decided to produce a "happy ending" for the character. Gaskell found filming her final scenes "emotional" and became hysterical when her colleagues began to bid her goodbye. She also said that she missed her co-stars after leaving, but stated she remains in contact with them.

In July 2011, Adam and Kirsty begin to treat a patient, Emily (Kirsty Armstrong), who has been raped. When Kirsty suggests that Emily should be assessed by the psychiatric team, Adam questions if she is allowing her own abuse judge her professional opinion. Furious, Kirsty reminds him that she did not enjoy her abuse, which is overheard by her colleagues, leaving Kirsty "horrified". Gaskell explained that Kirsty is "mortified", but when Tess comforts her, she realises she needs to accept her history and deal with it. The events of the episode began the process of Kirsty's departure.

Kirsty departs in the series 25 episode "When You're Smiling", broadcast on 30 July 2011. In the build-up to her departure, Kirsty has avoided discussing her feelings about Warren's death. Gaskell explained that Kirsty believes her abuse disappeared when Warren died, which is not correct. Kirsty treats a terminally ill patient with a "very positive outlook on life". The patient motivates Kirsty to be positive and create happier memories for her and Nita so Kirsty resigns from her job during her shift, before walking out of the ED. When Adam questions where she is going, Kirsty tells him she does not know and laughs. Gaskell called the moment "the most liberating moment of her adult life" and she said it was "a lovely moment to play". Kirsty ultimately decides to leave Holby, which Gaskell described as a place "full of bad memories". Producers wanted Kirsty to leave happily, which Gaskell liked as she felt Kirsty had experienced a lot of "misery".

== Reception ==
Louise Naughton of Nursing in Practice called Kirsty "forceful and feisty" as well as "capable and talented", but stated that she became "belittled, controlled and bruised" in her domestic abuse storyline. Sue Haasler of Pauseliveaction branded the character "Maverick Nurse Kirsty" in her episode reviews. Helen Childs of Inside Soap noted that Kirsty is "in her element" working in the ED. What's on TV observed that Kirsty had "a rough ride" in her time in the ED. Collins (TV Choice) called the domestic abuse storyline "very powerful" and described Kirsty's departure as "uplifting" and a "happy ending" for the character. Naughton believed that Casualty successfully presented how "strong, independent and successful women" can be at risk of domestic abuse, similarly to other women. She also opined that Kirsty had "left a lasting impression" on viewers of the show.

During the domestic abuse storyline, Gaskell received letters from viewers who related to Kirsty's situation. The actress found the letters "emotional" to read. She confirmed that some letters were from viewers who currently in an abusive relationship, which she found "frustrating" because she was unable to respond to those letters in case the abuser read Gaskell's response. In the letters she received, viewers praised the portrayal of the storyline, which left a positive impact on Gaskell.
