= Dylan Keogh =

Fictional character from the BBC medical drama Casualty

- Casualty character
- First appearance: "Only Human"; 12 March 2011
- Portrayed by: William Beck
- Spin-off appearances: Holby City (2012) "Unsafe Haven – Part 2"
- Crossover appearances: Emmerdale (2021)
- Duration: 2011–2012, 2014–

In-universe information
- Occupation: Senior Consultant in emergency medicine prev. Clinical lead
- Family: Brian Carroll (father); Roisin Carroll (mother); Rihanna Carroll (half-sister)
- Spouse: Sam Nicholls (until 2012)
- Children: Matty Linlaker (son)

Dylan Keogh is a fictional character from the BBC medical drama Casualty, played by William Beck. He first appeared in the twenty-fifth series episode "Only Human", broadcast on 12 March 2011. The character was introduced as a replacement for fellow emergency medicine doctor Ruth Winters (Georgia Taylor). Beck had briefly attended medical school before becoming an actor, and he felt the role was right for him. Dylan is a Consultant in emergency medicine and a member of Holby City Hospital's emergency department staff. Since the departure of Charlie Fairhead in 2024, Dylan has been the longest-serving character on the show.

Upon joining the cast, Beck was told by the producers that Dylan should not smile. Beck felt that he understood where Dylan was coming from. Dylan enjoys his work and likes to take on the more unusual cases and medical mysteries. He lives alone on a houseboat with his dog, Dervla, until her death. During his time in the ED, Dylan has developed strong friendships with Zoe Hanna (Sunetra Sarker) and Lofty Chiltern (Lee Mead).

Dylan's estranged wife Sam Nicholls (Charlotte Salt) was introduced to the ED in late 2011. They have a troubled relationship, which deteriorates further once Sam files for divorce and it began to affect their work. Dylan has hope that they might reconcile, until he learns Sam is dating Tom Kent (Oliver Coleman). The character departed the show in late 2012, after he struggled to be around Sam, whom he still loved. Two years later, in 2014, Beck reprised the role and expressed his excitement about playing Dylan again. Dylan briefly takes up the position of acting clinical lead, and tries to improve standards in the ED, but he was challenged by the job's demands.

In August 2015, producers introduced Dylan's estranged father, Brian (Matthew Marsh), which leading to further exploration of his background. Dylan has a poor relationship with Brian and his mental health suffered when they clashed. He is later diagnosed with obsessive–compulsive disorder. The show's story producer wanted to challenge the character with the condition and show how it affected him personally. Later storylines have seen the character accused of sexual harassment, smuggling a refugee into the country, and struggling with alcoholism.

== Casting ==
Actor William Beck joined the cast of Casualty as regular character Dylan Keogh during the twenty-fifth series. He was introduced as a replacement for fellow emergency medicine doctor Ruth Winters (Georgia Taylor), who had been admitted to a psychiatric unit in earlier episodes. Beck felt the role was right for him, as he had attended medical school before training as an actor. He commented, "I love all the medical details and jargon I have to learn. I didn't give up medical school because I couldn't do it, I just got bored with things very quickly at that age. I'm still fascinated by the endless variety of diseases and the questions that arise each time." Beck made his first appearance as Dylan in March 2011.

== Development ==
=== Characterisation and introduction ===
Before coming to Holby, Dylan worked as a country GP. Now, Dylan lives in picturesque chaos on a houseboat with the love of his life – his dog. He often gets people's names wrong and happily makes up stories about his personal life to mislead people or provoke a rise. Dylan is the ultimate cynic, but can occasionally shows a soft side and a strong moral compass. Dylan will always be an island, but sometimes we see Dylan appreciate the benefits of being part of a great team.

— An excerpt from Dylan's profile on the official Casualty website.

Shortly after joining the cast, Beck was told by the producers that Dylan should not smile; Dylan often employs sarcasm, especially when he gets frustrated. Speaking to Sarah Ellis of Inside Soap, Beck told her that Dylan finds his work easier to deal with, as he prefers 'known quantities' to people who he deems unreliable. If he can, he will avoid interacting with people and comes across as "shambolic" to put them off. Dylan also prefers to work on the more unusual cases and medical mysteries. Beck thought Dylan unintentionally put people's backs up and this was something that real-life doctors did too. He also said, "Dylan doesn't explain himself very well – his bedside manner is about half a mile from the bedside!" The BBC also described him as "abrupt and tactless".

The character has also been deemed "rude" and "uncaring", and some viewers have speculated that Dylan has Asperger syndrome. Beck said he had his own feelings about Dylan and was happy for people to make up their own minds about him. In a 2011 episode, Dylan treated an autistic woman who had taken her mother's medication; he cut down a hospital curtain in order to shield the woman from overwhelming sensory input. When Zoe saw this and asked, "Have you gone mad?", Dylan replied, "I prefer the term 'neurodiverse'." Beck knew the character from the moment he read the first scripts for Dylan. He shares some similarities with Dylan and understands where he's coming from. Dylan lives on a houseboat, which he shares with his dog Dervla. Beck joked that they were both very important to Dylan, but filming with them could occasionally be difficult. Dylan likes to spend time with Dervla instead of being with other people.

In the official press release for his arrival, Beck explained that in Dylan's fictional backstory he had ended up working as a general practitioner at a surgery in the countryside, despite being gifted at A&E medicine. Dylan was brought to the Emergency Department (ED) by Miriam Turner (Cheryl Campbell), who mentored him, along with clinical lead Nick Jordan (Michael French). Dylan makes a good diagnosis while he is in the ED, which both "impresses and annoys" Jordan. During Dylan's first full shift, he treated Hannah Fleet (Beth Goddard), a woman he had rescued from a bus crash. Hannah blamed Dylan for the facial injuries she sustained and assumed that he would not remember her. However, Dylan recited her medical history from memory and diagnosed her with an infection.

Beck pointed out that Dylan had a talent for diagnosis and working under pressure, making him an ideal ED doctor. Hannah later murdered Ambulance Technician Polly Emmerson (Sophia Di Martino) and Dylan blamed himself for her death. Dylan displayed his rarely seen emotional side when he treated a baby named Lucy. Dylan was initially hesitant when he is placed in charge of her care, but began to enjoy being around Lucy as he treated her. When Lucy's condition deteriorated, she has to be revived. Dylan then accuses her mother of passing on drugs to Lucy through breast milk.

=== Friendships ===
Producer Nikki Wilson commented that the relationship between Dylan and Zoe Hanna (Sunetra Sarker) was "very interesting". Speaking to Sarah Ellis of Inside Soap, Wilson said that when Beck and Sarker were told their characters had obvious chemistry, they were both surprised. She explained, "In one way, it's great that they're not playing it that way. But we really enjoy their banter, and there's definitely more to happen between them. Whether they'll get together remains to be seen..." Viewers wanted the characters to form a romantic relationship, but Sarker did not think either one of them would make the first move. Sarker also thought Dylan and Zoe were popular because they were not "cuddly" characters.

When Dylan returned to Holby, Beck thought it would be strange if he and Zoe did not continue their friendship, since she had played a role in bringing him back. Beck said that Dylan sees Zoe's presence as one of the reasons to stay at Holby. Sarker was pleased when Dylan was reintroduced to the show. She thought Dylan was more of a brother or best friend to Zoe, and said they had a professional attraction instead of a romantic one. She also referred to them as "a bit of an odd couple" living together on a houseboat with Dylan's dog.

Dylan also developed a friendship with nurse Lofty Chiltern (Lee Mead). Mead enjoyed acting with Beck, as they got on well. He also liked the contrast between Lofty's awkwardness and sincerity, and Dylan's dry and direct personality. The show's executive producer Oliver Kent was a fan of Lofty and Dylan's friendship, describing it a "completely fabulous bromance". Lofty wanted to please Dylan when he received a promotion and Dylan encouraged him to go outside of his comfort zone. Dylan later suggested that Lofty run the ED for the day, but it ended in tragedy when agency nurse Diane Stuart (Catherine Skinner) died. The incident occurred in a lift, where Lofty, Dylan, and Diane were attempting to resuscitate a patient. Diane was electrocuted when she failed to remove her hand from the patient in time.

In April 2016, new nurse David Hide (Jason Durr) was introduced. Following the end of his first shift, Dylan called David "an odd fish", which made Elaine Reilly of What's on TV wonder if they would form a friendship. Durr thought it was something that could happen, as David and Dylan were similar.

=== Marriage to Sam Nicholls ===
"We're keen to keep the Sam and Dylan plate spinning. I understand the desire to want to see the conclusion, but once that happens there's nowhere for that to go. The anticipation is delicious."

— Beck on the future of Sam and Dylan's marriage. (2012)

Towards the end of 2011, Sam Nicholls (played by Charlotte Salt) was introduced to the ED. It soon emerged that she and Dylan were married but estranged from one another. Beck told Lisa Williams of the Irish Independent that it was highly unlikely Sam and Dylan's marriage would work out, explaining, "if I say that we were married in Vegas, that gives you some idea of the longevity of the relationship". Beck also joked that Dylan had a stronger relationship with his dog Dervla than with Sam. Salt hoped that viewers were surprised to learn that Sam and Dylan were married. She thought that both characters were complicated and that they had a troubled relationship.

Sam saved Dylan from being attacked by patient Keith Parr (Marshall Lancaster) by placing Keith in a headlock. Salt said that when Sam saw Dylan's life was under treat, her immediate instinct was to protect him. When Keith later accused Sam of assault, Zoe asked her to meet with Keith and apologise. When she refused, Zoe asked Dylan to try and make Sam see sense. Dylan was "reluctant" to get involved in the matter, but was worried that Sam would suffer for defending him. Sam is later brought before the General Medical Council for her use of excessive force on Keith, and Dylan is called to the stand. He defends Sam, but is shocked to learn from her former army colleague Iain Dean (Michael Stevenson) that he and Sam had an affair. Salt told Sarah Ellis of Inside Soap, "Dylan is very hurt that she never told him what happened while they were together. He finds it hard to hide his real feelings for her when he's being questioned They lose all sense of professionalism, and end up bickering in the middle of the hearing room!"

Dylan and Sam are brought together when they are called out to treat two patients trapped in a cave. The couple tried to stay professional, but when they began to snipe about their failed marriage, they placed themselves and their patients in danger. Salt explained that when Sam receives the call to rescue a pair of trapped dog walkers, she needs someone else's help and the only doctor who could abseil was Dylan. As they climbed into the hole to treat Amanda Franks (Connie Fisher) and David Hooper (Daymon Britton), all of Dylan and Sam's issues about their marriage came to a head. However, when David's condition deteriorated, Dylan and Sam set their problems aside to help save him. Salt commented, "by the end of it, she and Dylan do bond. They realise that, in the grand scheme of things, their argument isn't that important." Sam filed for divorce in secret and planned to tell Dylan in person, before he read the solicitor's letter. When she asks to talk to him after work, Dylan jumps to the conclusion that she wants to get back together and he books a table at a restaurant for them.

Relations between the couple deteriorated during the divorce proceedings. Dylan refused to have anything to do with Sam and began belittling her. Nick Jordan (Michael French) notices their behaviour and tells Sam to find a way to work with Dylan, but she decides to return to the Army. However, Sam was unsuccessful in her effort, as the Army refused to take her back. Dylan continued to say what he thought about her and she tried to rise above his comments. Dylan initially refuses to sign the divorce papers, as he knew that is what Sam wanted. Salt also thought that Dylan held hopes of a reconciliation, but Sam knew that getting divorced was the right thing to do. Salt added that Sam did not want to lose Dylan's friendship or have him hate her. Dylan and Sam's issues began affecting their jobs and they almost lost a patient during one argument. However, they managed to sort out their differences when Sam opened up about why she came to Holby, her selfishness and "the baggage she was carrying around with her." Dylan later saw Sam kissing fellow doctor Tom Kent (Oliver Coleman), causing him to become jealous. As they started arguing about a patient's diagnosis, Dylan lost his temper and told them that he knew they were together.

=== Amanda Franks ===
Fisher later reprised her role as Amanda from the cave rescue storyline and found employment in the hospital shop. In an interview with Digital Spy's Daniel Kilkelly, show producer Nikki Wilson told him that Amanda's appearance would trigger "an interesting" storyline arc for Dylan. As Dylan saved Amanda's life, she had developed "a hero worship of him", which Wilson said would test Dylan. When Amanda tries to spend time with Dylan by inviting him out dog walking, he angrily tells her that nothing would ever happen between them. When she later heard Dylan's dog, Dervla, had gone missing, Amanda offered to help Dylan find her, even though he doubted she would be found. Amanda soon located Dervla and brought her back to a relieved Dylan. An Inside Soap columnist wondered if Amanda had engineered Dervla's disappearance in an effort to get closer to Dylan. Dylan later suspected Amanda had developed feelings for him. When he found a photograph of Dervla on Amanda's food trolley, he was worried that her supposed crush was getting out of hand. At the ED Christmas party, he eventually "snapped" and accused her of stalking him. Sam then informed Dylan that she gave Amanda the photograph, as Amanda had been making everyone in the ED a personalised mug as a goodbye present.

=== Departure and return ===
"He just chimes with me in a way that a lot of parts don't. People will pronounce on him various medical conditions, or say that he's not an accurate depiction of what a doctor can be, but I'm pretty certain he is. I've met people like that."

— William Beck on why he enjoys playing Dylan. (2014)

As Dylan continued to struggle being around Sam and Tom in the ED, he made the decision to leave Holby. When Dylan saw Tom punch locum consultant Dominic Carter (Gary Cady), he quickly reported Tom to Zoe, earning the doctor a suspension. However, Dylan was not satisfied and later told Tom what he did, resulting in them squaring up to each other. Dylan admitted that he was still in love with Sam and realised that he would never get over her if they continued to work together. A show spokesperson commented, "seeing Sam and Tom together is killing Dylan. Dylan's not good at showing emotions, but deep down he really is in love with Sam." Zoe accepted Dylan's resignation and he said goodbye to Sam, before leaving the hospital.

Two years after his departure, Beck reprised his role and Dylan returned to the ED. Producer Erika Hossington had teased the character's return in August 2014, saying that a "familiar face" would make a surprise reappearance in October that year. Beck told David Brown of the Radio Times that returning to the show felt "strange but yet very similar" and he relished the chance to play Dylan again, as he enjoyed the role. Dylan returned to an understaffed ED as a locum. Zoe and Caleb Knight (Richard Winsor) were struggling to cope with an influx of football fans who were injured during a fight, so Dylan got straight to work. He told Charlie Fairhead (Derek Thompson) of his intentions to stay for one shift before he moved on, but he was persuaded to stay.

Since Dylan's departure there were some changes in the ED and Connie Beauchamp (Amanda Mealing) was promoted to Clinical Lead. Dylan finds Connie attractive, but in "a professional way". Beck explained that the characters would have been aware of each other during his first stint in the ED and that there could be some clashes between them in the future, as Dylan does not enjoy being told what to do. When asked if Dylan was over Sam, Beck replied that Dylan was in "a better place" and that he only wanted Sam to be happy. With Sam and Tom absent from Holby, Dylan felt it was okay for him to come back. The character's return to Holby gave the writers an opportunity to explore the character's fictional backstory and personal life further. Beck stated, "From the story's point of view, we get a good opportunity to see how Dylan reacts in the curiously adverse conditions of walking into a hospital that's suffering from budgetary cuts and an opportunity to see how he deals with being given more responsibility." Dylan was shown to be living on a house boat in Holby's marina with his dog Dervla.

=== Acting clinical lead ===
Following Connie's sudden departure, Max Walker (Jamie Davis) suggested that Dylan should take up the position of acting clinical lead. Dylan made it clear that he was not interested. But when Zoe told him that CEO Henrik Hanssen (Guy Henry) was keen for him to take the job, Dylan accepted it. Beck told Elaine Reilly of What's on TV that Dylan feels emotionally blackmailed by Zoe, after she says there will be benefits to the job, such as hiring and firing staff. Dylan took his new role seriously and hoped to improve standards in the ED. But when he tries to have the nurses retrained, he came into conflict with Rita Freeman (Chloe Howman). Zoe was also "perplexed" by his management style, which was soon tested by a road accident with multiple casualties.

Beck said Dylan would be challenged by the job's demands and the amount of paperwork involved. He also told Reilly that Dylan would learn "a lot about himself" during his time as acting clinical lead. As Dylan settled into his new role, Connie returned to the ED and became clinical lead once more. Beck jokingly called Dylan's brief tenure as acting clinical lead "a spectacular success!" Connie's return undermined Dylan's confidence and affected his mental health, causing him to go on "a downward spiral". Beck commented that the storyline would see Dylan learn more about himself, which was not necessarily a good thing for him.

=== OCD and introduction of family ===
As the character was shown to be suffering with psychological issues, producers introduced his estranged father, Brian Carroll (Matthew Marsh), in August 2015, leading to further exploration of his fictional background. Brian was admitted to the ED, along with his girlfriend Hazel Leyton (Vicky Hall), following a lorry crash. Beck told Laura Heffernan of Inside Soap that Dylan had not been in touch with his father for a long time, so when he was reunited with him he felt "paralysed by the situation". Dylan initially showed little interest in what his father had been up to since their last meeting and Beck stated, "I think there's an element of pride in that. It's a battle between them, and Dylan doesn't want to be the one to give in." While Dylan tried to avoid his father, he was forced to intervene when Hazel's condition deteriorated. However, Hazel was in Bay 4 and Dylan did not want to treat anyone in there. Beck stated that unbeknownst to Dylan at the time, he was actually suffering from obsessive–compulsive disorder (OCD).

As Dylan treated Hazel, the pressure on him increased. He and Brian later clashed, which did further damage to Dylan's mental state. Beck summed up Dylan's situation: "Dylan was getting it right all the time, so it's very interesting to see what happens when he gets it wrong and patients start to die on him. He's finally forced to accept that he can't control everything around him." Beck also pointed out that Dylan felt personally responsible for the patients that had died in Bay 4. Stuart Cheetham, the show's story producer, wanted to challenge Dylan by giving him OCD, as he is deemed to be a very logical and rational person. The team wanted to see how far they could take Dylan with the storyline. Cheetham also wanted to explore how OCD personally affects Dylan and show his attempts to seek help with bringing it under control. Beck was keen for the storyline not to come across as sensationalist and he hoped it would show viewers with the condition that they are not alone.

Dylan was reunited with Brian once again when he was brought into the ED needing treatment. This time, Brian brought his infant daughter, and Dylan's half-sister, Rihanna with him. While Dylan was meeting his sister for the first time, Brian collapsed and he was diagnosed with chronic obstructive pulmonary disease. Brian later asks Dylan to be Rihanna's godfather, but when Dylan catches his father smoking outside the hospital, it led to a confrontation between them. A couple of months later, Brian, Hazel and Rihanna are brought to the ED following a house fire. Dylan immediately sets about helping Rihanna, and when her condition worsens, he is forced to perform an emergency procedure to save her. Dylan also learned that the fire was started by Brian's discarded cigarette.

=== Accusation of sexual harassment ===
In late October 2016, new F1 doctor Sebastian Grayling (Rik Makarem) joins the ED staff and immediately makes a bad impression when he hits Dylan's dog Dervla with his bike, causing her to run off. Seb then learns that Dylan has volunteered to be his mentor. As his first day goes on, Seb ignores the wishes of a dying patient, managing to "spark the wrath" of both Dylan and clinical lead Elle Gardner (Jaye Griffiths). As their working relationship continues, Dylan is firm with Seb. He softens a little when he notices Seb's reaction to his father, Archie Grayling's (James Wilby) appearance in the ED. Dylan realises that Seb is afraid of disappointing his father, and they later join forces to support Seb's patient, who refuses surgery. Following the ED Christmas party, Seb comes to see Dylan at his house boat and attempts to kiss him, but he is "embarrassed" when Dylan rejects his advances. During their next shift together, Dylan warns Seb to make more of an effort with his work or he will fail his placement. Seb then goes to Elle and accuses Dylan of making an unwanted advance towards him.

Seb's allegation comes as "a huge shock" to Elle, and since she knew that Dylan is not gay, she warns Seb to think before taking the matter any further. Realising that he is in danger of failing his placement, Seb then spreads rumours about the incident to his colleagues. Soon, a photo of Dylan hugging Seb emerges and Elle informs Dylan that she has to look into Seb's accusation. Dylan publicly defends himself, but Seb's rumours have already convinced many of their colleagues that he is telling the truth. While Seb makes an official complaint, Dylan trashes his house boat in anger. The fallout from Seb's sexual harassment accusation was explored during the episode broadcast on 7 January 2017. With Dylan facing suspension from the hospital, Max and Jez Andrews (Lloyd Everitt) try to record Seb admitting to making a false allegation, but their plan fails. However, when Seb proves his worth in resus, he has "a much-needed change of heart" and withdraws his statement about Dylan. With Dylan cleared of any wrongdoing, he offers to transfer Seb to a different hospital.

=== Sanosi and alcoholism ===
At the start of series 32, Dylan is one of four characters, along with David, Louise Tyler (Azuka Oforka) and Alicia Munroe (Chelsea Halfpenny), who travel to Northern France to offer assistance at a refugee camp. There, Dylan bonds with a young boy called Sanosi Jemal (Tut Nyout) and his sister, Mariam (Adelaide Obeng). Beck enjoyed filming the scenes away from the hospital set, and he also liked that the episodes were bringing more awareness to the plight of refugees. Dylan later brings Sanosi back to Britain with him, and producer Lucy Raffety confirmed that Dylan's actions and the repercussions would lead to "a devastatingly dark time" for him. Raffety stated, "It's the start of a dark, downward spiral for Dylan and this Sanosi story taps into a deep chasm in his soul, one of desperate loneliness – and one he will probably never admit. I think that is a wound that is opened up through this story and we will face some very difficult times ahead."

Although Dylan bonds with Sanosi, he knows that the boy cannot stay with him forever. He gets in contact with Sanosi's uncle, Kamal (Emmanuel Idowu), and leaves Sanosi with him. However, Kamal is later arrested for drug trafficking and Dylan is forced to care for Sanosi once more. Sanosi overhears Dylan and David arguing about what will happen if Dylan is caught, and he runs off. After falling off a ladder and injuring his leg, Dylan and David are forced to take Sanosi to the hospital for treatment. Dylan eventually drives Sanosi to a police station, so he can hand himself in. Dylan is "stricken with guilt" for putting his career before Sanosi, and turns to alcohol in a bid to cope with his actions. When Connie take a leave of absence to seek treatment for cancer, Dylan is promoted to acting clinical lead once more. He struggles with the paperwork and various IT issues, which lead him to drink whiskey from a bottle stored in his desk. Dylan later allows Ethan Hardy's (George Rainsford) patient to discharge herself, even though she is obviously hiding her symptoms. When she is readmitted to the ED, Ethan gives Dylan "a piece of his mind". At the end of the day, Dylan contacts the hospital's CEO to resign from acting clinical lead.

== Reception ==
For his portrayal of Dylan, Beck was nominated in the Best Actor category at the 2018 TV Choice Awards. He was later nominated for Best Soap Actor (Male) at the 2018 Digital Spy Reader Awards; he came in joint ninth place with 3.9% of the total votes.

Of Dylan, Inside Soap's Sarah Ellis quipped "his people skills are even more questionable than those of his frosty predecessor, Ruth Winters". A reporter for the Western Mail branded the character "extremely grumpy". A South Wales Echo journalist dubbed him "rather direct". When asked what reaction he had received from viewers, Beck replied that he was "very fairly treated" and often got sympathy from certain age groups. However, some viewers were displeased when Dylan came between Sam and Tom, and Beck was sent poison pen letters, which led him to reassure viewers that Dylan would not come between Zoe and Max.

David Butcher of Radio Times was a fan of the character, writing "Dylan is such a peculiar, grizzled, blinking, arrogant, uptight, tactless sociopath that it was hard to imagine him having a relationship with anything warmer than a stethoscope. But I like Dylan. He calls a spade a spade and a subarachnoid haematoma a subarachnoid haematoma." Butcher added that although his relationship with Sam was a surprise, they shared a believable chemistry, and he called them "embittered exes." Sue Haasler, a reviewer for the Metro, branded Dylan "TV's grumpiest medic".

After Dylan was promoted to Clinical Lead, a contributor to The People noted that "things are going well for Dr Dylan Keogh". When Dylan's father was admitted to the ED, a Daily Mirror reporter noted that Dylan was "not happy" to Brian, as he "openly despises him!" Duncan Lindsay of the Metro observed, "Dylan is forced to face up to his demons as he is diagnosed with OCD – but it proves harder than he ever imagined." Following the release of the show's Summer 2016 trailer, Elaine Reilly of What's on TV noted, "Not much of a joker at the best of times, it looks like the summer months are going to be super serious for consultant Dylan Keogh." Reilly also called the character "dour", a "cynical consultant", and "the ED's resident eccentric doctor".
