= Nursing in Practice =

British medical magazine and website

- Editor: Carolyn Scott
- News editor: Megan Ford
- Director of content and editorial: Gemma Collins
- Frequency: Bimonthly
- Publisher: Cogora
- Language: English
- Website: Official website
- ISSN: 1473-9445

Nursing in Practice is a bimonthly British print magazine and website aimed at practice and community nurses, and midwives. It provides news and comment on clinical and health policy developments, covering topics including cardiac care, dermatology, diabetes, and respiratory care.

The magazine is published by Cogora, previously Campden Health, and is available to all primary care nurses on request.

The magazine also produces a website, which archives its content and produces daily news, comment, polls, surveys, and videos. The website also offers a weekly news bulletin.

In December 2011, Nursing in Practice broke the story that legal costs for negligence cases against nurses have trebled in the past five years.

== Events ==
Nursing in Practice produces conferences covering a variety of clinical and policy issues in cities including London, Glasgow, and Belfast. Its events are endorsed by professional bodies including the Royal College of General Practitioners, the Queen's Nursing Institute, and Unite the Union, and have been accredited by the Royal College of Nursing's Accreditation unit.

In the past the magazine also produced the Nursing in Practice Awards. In 2011 these were replaced by the General Practice awards, conducted jointly with sister titles Management in Practice and The Commissioning Review.
