= Lucy Gaskell =

British actress (born 1980)

- Born: 10 July 1980 (age 46); Wigan, Greater Manchester, England
- Education: Royal Welsh College of Music & Drama
- Occupation: Actress
- Years active: 2002–present
- Spouse: Mark Bonnar (m. 2007)
- Children: 2

Lucy Gaskell (born 10 July 1980) is a British actress. She studied at the Royal Welsh College of Music & Drama in 1998.

== Career ==
Gaskell made her professional stage debut in the Oxford Stage Company's production of The Cherry Orchard which toured the UK in June/July 2003. Gaskell was nominated for the Best Newcomer 2003 award by the Royal Television Society for her role in Cutting It.

Gaskell is known for the roles of Ruby Ferris in the BBC One drama series Cutting It and Kirsty Clements in Casualty. She has also appeared in television and in theatre in numerous roles including Waking the Dead, Holby City, and Where the Heart Is. Other roles include Kathy Nightingale in the 2007 Doctor Who episode "Blink" and Judy in Lesbian Vampire Killers. In 2010 she began a recurring role in the BBC horror drama Being Human as Sam, the love interest of main character George. From 2010 to 2011, she starred in Casualty, playing nurse Kirsty Clements, starring alongside schoolfriend Georgia Taylor, who plays Dr Ruth Winters. When she joined Casualty, she said in interviews that she was contracted indefinitely, but her pregnancy meant that she left after only one year.

== Personal life ==
Gaskell has been married to the Scottish actor Mark Bonnar since 28 December 2007. They have two children.

Gaskell has been an ambassador for the domestic violence survivors' charity Women's Aid since 2015.

== Filmography ==
=== Film ===
| Year | Title | Role | Notes |
|---|---|---|---|
| 2006 | The Last Drop | Benitta | |
| 2006 | Rolling the Dice: Adapting the Game to the Screen | Herself | Video Documentary Short |
| 2009 | Lesbian Vampire Killers | Judy | |
| 2015 | All the Ordinary Angels | Mimi | |
| 2018 | Final Score | Rachel | |

=== Television ===
| Year | Title | Role | Notes |
|---|---|---|---|
| 2002 | Where the Heart Is | Jeanette Bryant | 1 Episode |
| 2002 | Holby City | Joanne Townsend | 1 Episode |
| 2002 | RI:SE | Herself | 1 Episode |
| 2002–04 | Cutting It | Ruby Ferris | 18 Episodes |
| 2004 | From Bard to Verse | Herself | Unknown |
| 2004 | GMTV | Herself | 1 Episode |
| 2004 | Waking the Dead | Fay Harding | Episode: "Shadowplay" |
| 2005 | Dungeons & Dragons: Wrath of the Dragon God | Ormaline | Television Movie |
| 2006 | Vincent | Dawn Rice | Episode: "Under Fire" |
| 2006 | Ancient Rome: The Rise and Fall of an Empire | Constantia | Episode: "Constantine" |
| 2007 | Nuclear Secrets | Genia Peierls | Episode: "Superspy" |
| 2007 | Director's Debut | Eve Warner | 1 episode |
| 2007 | Doctor Who | Kathy Nightingale | Episode: "Blink" |
| 2007 | Blue Murder | Gunner Tracey Ruff | Episode: "Crisis Management" |
| 2007 | Sarah Parish's Story: Director's Debut | Herself | Television Movie Documentary |
| 2008 | HolbyBlue | Anna | 1 Episode |
| 2009 | Paradox | Katie | 1 Episode |
| 2009 | Whatever It Takes | Fiona | Television Movie |
| 2010 | Coming Up | Hayley | 1 Episode |
| 2010 | Being Human | Sam | 4 Episodes |
| 2010–11 | Casualty | Kirsty Clements | 45 Episodes |
| 2012 | Misfits | Lola | 3 Episodes |
| 2013 | Great Night Out | Mandy | 2 Episodes |
| 2013 | Crossing Lines | Fox | 1 Episode |
| 2015 | Suspects | Natalie Grainger | Episode: "Connections" |
| 2016 | DCI Banks | Rachel Li | Episode: "A Little Bit of Heart" |
| 2017 | Ransom | Aunt Gina | 1 Episode |
| 2025 | Sandokan | Aunt Frances | |
| 2025 | Midsomer Murders | Josie Randall | Episode: "Top of the Class" |

=== Video games ===
| Year | Title | Role | Notes |
|---|---|---|---|
| 2010 | Fable III | Additional Voices (Voice) | |

== Theatre ==
- The Cherry Orchard 2003 Oxford Stage Company national tour – Dunyasha
- Portugal (Zoltán Egressy) 2004 Cottesloe Theatre, National Theatre London – Ribbon
- All the Ordinary Angels (Nick Leather) 2005 – Manchester Royal Exchange Theatre – Lulu
- The Lunatic Queen (Torben Betts) 2005 – Riverside Studios, London – Princess Juana
- Taking Stock (Rob Johnstone) 2005 – The Studio, Manchester
- The Big House (Lennox Robinson) 2007 – Abbey Theatre, Dublin – Kate Alcock

== Radio ==
| Date | Title | Role | Director | Station |
|---|---|---|---|---|
| 2008 | Leona Cash | Leona Cash | | BBC Radio 4 |
| 26 January 2016 | A History of Paper | Her | Kirsty Williams | BBC Radio 4 Afternoon Play |

== Other work ==
- Sapphire and Steel: Water Like a Stone – The Girl
- Sapphire and Steel: Cruel Immortality – The Carer
- Fable III – Various Voices
- Being Human – Bad Blood – Audiobook Reader
- Code Name Verity - Maddie (Audiobook Reader)
