= William Beck (actor) =

British actor

- Education: Kineton High School; The Poor School
- Occupation: Actor
- Years active: 1999–present
- Children: 2

William Beck is a British actor, known for his appearances in the BBC drama series Robin Hood and as Dr. Dylan Keogh in Casualty.

== Early life ==
Beck has a family history of employment in medicine and states that his earliest memories are of hospitals. This encouraged him to join medical school, which he later quit, despite maintaining an interest. On quitting medical school, Beck explained, "I didn't give up medical school because I couldn't do it, I just think at that age I got bored with things very quickly." He added that he did not want to waste time and resources after realising he did not want to continue.

== Career ==
After deciding to quit medical school, Beck pursued a career in acting. He was inspired to become an actor by some people he met during medical school. His move to acting was criticised as it was thought that Beck was "giving up the most secure profession for perhaps the least secure". Beck has since featured in films Northanger Abbey, Snatch and Goal II: Living the Dream, as well as drama series Red Cap, Robin Hood and Vital Signs. Beck felt "fortunate" to receive such employment and was pleased to "work pretty consistently over the last 10 years". In March 2011, he stated that his favourite job was Robin Hood, praising his fellow cast members. His character was killed off early in the series, disappointing Beck. Beck also starred in The Suspicions of Mr Whicher, which he felt gave him the opportunity to learn from other actors.

Beck was introduced as "shambolic" consultant Dylan Keogh in the BBC medical drama Casualty in March 2011. The actor felt that his medical school background helped him in his role. He left the drama in 2012 and Dylan departed in December. Two years later, Beck reprised the role and Dylan returned in October 2014. The actor told David Brown of the Radio Times that he found it strange to return to Casualty, but looked forward to portraying the character again.

== Filmography ==
Film roles
Year	Title	Role
2000	Snatch	Neil
2001	Gypsy Woman	Gary
2003	Quicksand	Nicoli
2004	Fallen	Dave Walker
2006	The Truth	Scott
2007	More More More	Scott
2007	Northanger Abbey	John Thorpe
2007	Goal II: Living the Dream	Steve Parr
2008	The Agent	Alexander Joyce
2009	Infidel	David
2017	Bitter Harvest	Stefan

Television roles
Year	Title	Role	Notes
1999	The Bill	Adam Thwaite	Episode: "All Change"
2000	Attachments	Reece Wilson	
2003	Serious and Organised	Billy English	1 episode
2003	The Canterbury Tales	Colin	Episode: "The Pardoner's Tale"
2003	Second Generation	Nick	
2003–2004	Red Cap	Sgt. Maj. Steve Forney	
2004	The Murder Room	DI Piers Tarrant	
2006	Johnny and the Bomb	Dr. Harris	
2006	Vital Signs	Dr. Harris	
2006	Robin Hood	Roy	4 episodes
2008	Filth: The Mary Whitehouse Story	David Turner	
2011	M.I. High	Theo Phantom	Episode: "Ghosts"
2011	Hustle	Jiles	Episode: "Clearance from a Deal"
2011	The Suspicions of Mr Whicher	Dolly Williamson	
2011–2012, 2014–present	Casualty	Dylan Keogh	Series regular
2012	Holby City	Dylan Keogh	Episode: "Unsafe Haven: Part Two"
2013	Whitechapel	John Washington	2 episodes
2014	Midsomer Murders	Michael Dewar	Episode: "Let Us Prey"
2014	Death in Paradise	Matthew Webster	1 episode
2014	The Devil's Harvest		
2014	The Great Fire	Richard Smith	
2014	Kim Philby: His Most Intimate Betrayal	Nicholas Elliot	2 episodes
2019	Pointless Celebrities	Himself	1 episode

== Theatre ==
- They Shoot Horses, Don't They? (1999)
- Kes (2004)
- Festen (2004)
- The Tragedy of Thomas Hobbes (2008)
- The Merchant of Venice (2008)
- The Taming of the Shrew (2008)
- Arthur & George (2010)

== Radio ==
- Filthy Rich: A BBC Radio 4 Dramatisation
