= Mark Letheren =

English actor (born 1971)

- Born: Mark Vincent Letheren; 6 February 1971 (age 55); Chelmsford, Essex, England
- Occupation: Actor
- Years active: 1993 – present
- Partner: Georgia Taylor
- Website: mark.letheren.org

Mark Vincent Letheren (born 6 February 1971) is an English actor.

He is known for his roles as journalist Simon Kitson in ITV's drama The Bill, as Ben Harding in the BBC One drama Casualty and for his recurring role as DS Kevin Geoffries in Wire in the Blood.

== Early life and education ==
Letheren was born in Chelmsford, Essex. He attended Ardingly College and the Guildhall School of Music and Drama.

== Career ==
=== Film ===
His large-screen debut was in the historical drama Restoration, with Robert Downey Jr. in 1995.

=== Television ===
He has appeared in many television dramas, including Wire in the Blood, The Bill, Silent Witness, Casualty, Holby City, Waking the Dead, Heartbeat and A Touch of Frost.

=== Stage ===
He has also performed on stage many times throughout his career. He played Jamie in the world premiere of Jonathan Harvey's Beautiful Thing, starred in Mark Healey's adaptation of John Fowles' The Collector, and toured the US with the Royal Shakespeare Company, as Francis Flute in A Midsummer Night's Dream.

He played 'Bernie Dodd' in The Country Girl at the Apollo Theatre in 2010. He also played the 'Stalker' in The Bodyguard (musical) at the Adelphi Theatre, between 2012 and 2014.

In 2014, he appeared in Lotty's War (written by Giuliano Crispini and directed by Bruce Guthrie) at the Yvonne Arnaud Theatre, Guildford, before it began touring the UK.

== Personal life ==
Letheren previously lived in Bristol with his long-term partner, actress Georgia Taylor, whom he met on the set of the television series Casualty. The two of them split in 2022.

== Filmography ==
=== Films ===
Year	Film	Role	Notes
1995	Restoration	Daniel	
1996	A Midsummer Night's Dream	Francis Flute / Peaseblossom	
1997	Wilde	Charles Parker	
2000	The Blind Date	Jack De Souza	
2001	South West 9	Mitch	
2004	Stage Beauty	Male Emilia / Dickie	
2004	Control	Villard	

=== Television ===
Year	Show	Role	Notes
1993	15: The Life and Death of Philip Knight	Lee Harris	
1993	The Bill	Justin Adams	1 episode: Street Legal
1994	Anna Lee	Paul Schiller	1 episode: Requiem
1994	Pie in the Sky	Kevin Heywood, 'Reynard the Fox'	1 episode: Endangered Species
1994	Wycliffe	Giles Vinter	1 episode: The Last Rites
1994	Second Thoughts	Adam	1 episode: Full House
1995	The Bill	Paul Rowland	1 episode: Today and Tomorrow
1995	Moving Story	Matthew	1 episode: Canterbury Tales
1996	A Touch of Frost	LCpl. Morison	1 episode: Unknown Soldiers
1997	Noah's Ark	David Bradley	1 episode: Healing Touch
1997	Liberty! The American Revolution	British Soldier	3 episodes: Blows Must Decide: 1774–1776; The Times That Try Men's Souls: 1776–1777; Oh, Fatal Ambition: 1777–1778
1998	Silent Witness	D.S. Rob Bradley	Recurring; 4 episodes
1998	Casualty	Kenny Howell	1 episode: Next of Kin
1999	Births, Marriages and Deaths	Josh	
1999	Jack of Hearts	Jim	1 episode: 1.1
2000	McCready and Daughter	Morgan	
2000	Urban Gothic	Lucien	1 episode: The One Where...
2000	Burnside	Jerry Forbes	2 episodes: Exposed (parts 1 & 2)
2001	Attila	Thorismund	
2001	Murder in Mind	Jack Seddon	1 episode: Teacher
2001	Tales from Pleasure Beach	Drew	3 part series
2001	Heartbeat	Clive Denby	1 episode: Russian Roulette
2002	Casualty	Neil Johnson	1 episode: Acceptance
2002	The Bill	Simon Kitson	Recurring; 23 episodes
2002–2008	Wire in the Blood	DS Kevin Geoffries	Series regular
2003	Danielle Cable: Eyewitness	DC Jason Wheeler	
2003	Keen Eddie	Morris Lange	1 episode: Achtung Baby
2004	Frances Tuesday	Reece	
2005	Waking the Dead	Toby Holmes	1 episode: Cold Fusion
2005	Heartbeat	Billy Andrews	1 episode: The End of the Road
2005	A Ghost Story for Christmas: M. R. James – A View from a Hill	Dr. Fanshawe	
2006	Judge John Deed	Ben Bradwell	1 episode: Hard Gating
2006	Holby City	Connor Lucas	1 episode: Brother's Keeper
2008–2010, 2014, 2015	Casualty	Ben Harding	Recurring; 16 episodes
2012	Silent Witness	Anthony Gilston	Recurring; 2 episodes
2014	EastEnders	Reverend Chris Skinner	3 episodes
2015	DCI Banks	Matthew Tate	2 episodes: Ghosts (parts 1 & 2)

== See also ==
- List of English actors
