= Ben Turner (actor) =

British actor

- Born: 3 February 1980 (age 46); Hackney, London, England
- Occupation: Actor
- Years active: 2005–present

Ben Turner (born 3 February 1980) is a British Iranian actor, most notable for his roles as nurse Jay Faldren on BBC's Casualty, the lead role of Amir in multiple stage adaptations of The Kite Runner, and as Louis XV in Doctor Who.

== Life and career ==
Turner was born in Hackney, London to an English father, actor Graham Turner of the Royal Shakespeare Company, and an Iranian mother. He was educated at Dulwich College, well known for its pedigree of actors including the founder Edward Alleyn. He then trained as an actor at Guildhall School of Music and Drama.

He has appeared in many productions in television, film, theatre and radio, including Michael Grandage's production of Richard II.

He has also appeared in several charity shows such as Children in Need, 2009 in the Casualty special as Staff Nurse Jay Faldren and also Let's Dance for Sport Relief 2010.

Ben appeared in the first of the live shows along with Casualty stars Charles Dale (Big Mac) and Tony Marshall (Noel Garcia) as well as Holby City stars Rosie Marcel (Jac Naylor) and Luke Roberts (Joseph Byrne). He left Casualty in December 2011, along with co-star Georgia Taylor, who played his main love interest in the show.

Following his extensive stage experience Turner took on "without doubt the biggest challenge I've had professionally", appearing in the stage production of The Kite Runner, which had its European premiere at Nottingham Playhouse in April 2013. Turner starred in the production playing both the younger and older versions of the main character Amir. The show's popularity returned it for another run with a UK tour premiering August through November, 2014 and again in the West End in 2016.

Turner joined the cast of WPC 56, in the regular lead role of Detective Inspector Max Harper, in Series 2, which was shown by the BBC in February 2014.

== Filmography ==
Year	Title	Role	Director	Company	Notes
2004	As If	Andrew	David Kerr	Carnival Films	
2005	Bilingual	George	Chamoun Issa	NFTS	
2005	Casualty	David Pickering	Graeme Harper	BBC Bristol	Series 19 Episode 30: 'And on That Farm'
2005	Syriana	Student Protest Leader	Steven Gagan	Warner Brothers	(uncredited)
2005	Love Soup	Ray	Verity Lambert, David Renwick	BBC One	
2005	I Shouldn't Be Alive	Markus Stamm	Mark Westcott, Matthew Whiteman	Darlow Smithson Productions	
2006	Doctor Who	King Louis XV	Euros Lyn	BBC	Episode: The Girl in the Fireplace
2007	The Bill	Si Magley	Karl Neilson	ITV	Series 23, Episode 62: Crash Test
2008	Casualty	Sam Baxter	Jon Sen	BBC Bristol	Series 22 Episode 33: 'Someone's Lucky Night'
2008	The Big Slap	Ben Turner	Tom Shrapnel	Funny or Die	(Short)
2008	Adulthood	Giles	Noel Clarke	Limelight	
2008–2011, 2016	Casualty	Jay Faldren		BBC Bristol	Series 23:8 through Series 26:16 + Series 31:1
2011	Richard II	Mowbray	Michael Grandage	Donmar Warehouse	
2012	Love in the Afternoon	Ollie	Lou Gerring	Brek Taylor	(Short)
2012	Been Here For Days	Stuart	Dominik Rippl	Nona Film	(Short)
2013	Death in Paradise	Chris Winchester	Alrick Riley	BBC	Episode 2:4
2013	The Fifth Estate	Reporter	Bill Condon	DreamWorks	(uncredited)
2014	WPC 56	DI Max Harper	Niall Fraser / James Larkin	BBC One	Series 2
2014	300: Rise of an Empire	General Artaphernes	Noam Murro	Legendary Pictures / Warner Bros.	
2015	The Coroner	Dr. Mel Siddiqui	Niall Fraser	BBC Birmingham	Series 1 Episode 10: Dirty Dancing
2015	EastEnders	Adrian Quinlan		BBC One	
2016	The Illiad	Achilles	Mark Thomson	Royal Lyceum Theatre, Edinburgh	
2017	6 Days	Salim	Toa Fraser	General Film Corporation / Icon	
2022	The Ipcress File	Adem	James Watkins		6 episodes
2025	Split Fiction	J.D Rader	Josef Fares	Hazlelight Studios	Video game
