= Tristan Gemmill =

British actor (born 1967)

- Born: Tristan John Gemmill; 6 June 1967 (age 58); London, England
- Occupation: Actor
- Years active: 1981–present
- Known for: Coronation Street (2000, 2015–2019); Casualty (2007–2011)
- Spouse: Emily Hamilton (m. 2001)
- Children: 3

Tristan John Gemmill (born 6 June 1967) is a British actor from London, most notable for his roles as Dr Adam Trueman in Casualty and Robert Preston in Coronation Street.

== Early life and education ==
Son of Brasenose College, Oxford-educated watercolour artist Andrew Gemmill, formerly employed by the BBC and in the recruitment business (son of the first-class cricketer William Gemmill), and Diana, daughter of Sir Robert Peter Burton-Chadwick, 2nd Bt, Gemmill was educated at Holmewood House School, Royal Tunbridge Wells, Kent, up to the age of 13. He then won an Academic Scholarship to Tonbridge School. Gemmill's paternal grandmother was from New Zealand.

== Career ==
He is best known for his TV work, appearing in former Channel 5 soap opera Family Affairs, Where the Heart Is, BBC Three's Grass and Kay Mellor's drama series Strictly Confidential. He also played DC Mitch Cowen in EastEnders in 2005. Another minor role was as an actor in a crime reconstruction in Lynda La Plante's Trial & Retribution.

In January 2000, Gemmill appeared in Coronation Street as a therapist for Leanne Tilsley and in 2001, he appeared in six episodes of The Bill as corrupt Detective Sergeant Peter Cork, in a storyline following a serial rapist. These episodes saw his character sexually assault DC Kate Spears, romance PC Cass Rickman, and be exposed as colluding with another corrupt officer in sheltering the rapist (played by Michael McKell), only to be killed after being stabbed by the same rapist. He also starred in the final series of London's Burning as firefighter Frank Mooney in 2002.

In 2005, on ITV, Gemmill starred in Distant Shores, as Duncan, alongside Samantha Bond and Peter Davison, and also appeared as Major Despard in "Cards on the Table" part of the 10th season of Agatha Christie's Poirot. In 2007, Gemmill appeared as Dr David York in the Channel 4 drama Cape Wrath.

Gemmill played consultant Adam Trueman in the long-running BBC medical drama Casualty from September 2007 to August 2011. In a "celebrity" edition of Mastermind, aired on BBC 1 on 1 January 2010, Gemmill defeated comedians John Bishop and Ed Byrne and TV presenter Anneka Rice to win the trophy. His specialist subject was the Apollo Moon Landings.

In May and June 2012, he filmed a fantasy adventure movie then titled Mariah Mundi and the Midas Box throughout the South West of England, playing the role of Isambard Black. The film was released in 2014 as The Adventurer: The Curse of the Midas Box, and garnered mostly negative reviews.

On 14 June 2013, it was announced that Gemmill was to take over the lead role as Frank Farmer in the West End musical The Bodyguard, replacing Lloyd Owen from 9 September 2013 – March 2014.

From 2015 to 2019, he portrayed Tracy Barlow's former husband Robert Preston in Coronation Street, taking over from the original actor, Julian Kay. The character was killed off on Christmas Day 2019.

== Personal life ==
Gemmill grew up in Cowden, Kent and he is married to former actress Emily Hamilton; the couple have a son and two daughters. He moved to Australia with his family at the age of 15, where he studied acting. In 1991, he made his acting debut playing a male nurse in episode 15 of the Australian soap opera, Chances. He appeared again in episode 30 as a flower delivery man. The following year, he returned to Britain to launch his acting career there.
