= Georgia Taylor =

English actress (born 1980)

- Born: Claire Marie Jackson; 26 February 1980 (age 46); Wigan, Greater Manchester, England
- Occupation: Actress
- Years active: 1997–present

Georgia Taylor (born Claire Marie Jackson; 26 February 1980) is an English actor. Her TV roles include Toyah Battersby in the ITV soap opera Coronation Street (1997–2003, 2016–present), Ruth Winters in the BBC One medical drama series Casualty (2007–2011), and Kate Barker in the ITV crime series Law & Order: UK (2013–2014).

== Early life ==
Taylor was born Claire Marie Jackson, on 26 February 1980 in Wigan, Greater Manchester, England. She attended the Willpower Youth Theatre in Wigan as a teenager.

== Career ==
In 1997, Taylor began playing Toyah Battersby in Coronation Street. In 2001, she won the Best Dramatic Performance British Soap Award for playing Toyah. She quit the show in 2003 and has since appeared in episodes of Where the Heart Is, New Street Law, Lilies, Red Cap, the BBC's The Afternoon Play series and Life on Mars.

In September 2016 it was announced that Taylor would return to Coronation Street as Toyah Battersby. She resumed her role in the episode aired on Christmas Day 2016.

In 2003, she appeared with Duncan Bannatyne in the Tyne Tees Television comedy pilot Girls' Club. In 2004 and 2006, Taylor played a recurring role in the Golden Globe award nominated series Blackpool and its follow up Viva Blackpool for BBC One.

In May 2005, Taylor appeared in The Woman Before at the Royal Court opposite Helen Baxendale. In the same year, she received rave reviews for her role in Christmas is Miles Away at the Royal Exchange Theatre in Manchester.

In 2006, Taylor played Fiona in the film version of the transatlantic stage hit The History Boys. She appeared in an independent short film Soul Shutter in 2008, and also had a small role in the 2008 feature film The Bank Job. Her radio credits include Dakota of the White Flats by Phillip Ridley.

Taylor joined the cast of the BBC One medical drama Casualty as series regular Ruth Winters in September 2007.

She left Casualty in December 2011, along with co-star Ben Turner, who played her main love interest in the show.

In 2013 and 2014, Taylor played Junior Crown Prosecutor Kate Barker for two series (seasons) of Law & Order: UK.

== Personal life ==
In 2003 Taylor was in a relationship with musician Mark Eyden, and was planning marriage and children. As of 2013, she was living in Bristol with her partner, actor Mark Letheren, whom she met on the set of Casualty.

== Filmography ==
Year	Title	Role	Notes
1997–2003, 2016–present	Coronation Street	Toyah Battersby	Series regular
1998–1999, 2013	This Morning	Herself	4 episodes
1998	Sooty & Co.	Toyah Battersby	Episode: "Estate Agents"
2000, 2007, 2017	Loose Women	Herself	3 episodes
2003	Where the Heart Is	Jodie Walters	Episode: "Archangel"
2004	The Royal	Ellen	Episode: "Home to Roost"
2004	Blackpool	Shyanne Holden	Main cast; 6 episodes
2006	The Afternoon Play	Molly Connolly	Episode: "Molly"
2006–2007	Life on Mars	Denise Williams	Series 1: Episodes 4 Series 2: Episode 4
2006	Viva Blackpool	Shyanne Holden	Television film
2006	The History Boys	Fiona	Film
2007	Lilies	Phyllis Cook	Episode: "The Chit Behind King Billy"
2007	New Street Law	Lorraine Granger	Series 2: Episode 4
2007–2011	Casualty	Ruth Winters	Series regular; 176 episodes
2008	The Bank Job	Ingrid Burton	Film
2012	Lewis	Honey Addams	Episode: "Fearful Symmetry"
2012	Love in the Afternoon	Audrey	Short film
2013–2014	Law & Order: UK	Kate Barker	Series regular; 14 episodes
2013	70 Stone: The Man Who Can't Be Saved	Herself; narrator	2 episodes
2014	One in Five	Lucy	Short film
2014	Street Kid World Cup	Herself; narrator	Series 1: Episodes 1 & 2
2014	The Chase: Celebrity Special	Herself; contestant	Series 4: Episode 12
2015	Midsomer Murders	Bella Summersbee	Episode: "The Dagger Club"
2016	Agatha Raisin	Steph	Episode: "Hell's Bells"
2018, 2020	Lorraine	Herself; guest	2 episodes

== Awards and nominations ==
Year	Award	Category	Work	Result	Ref.
2001	The British Soap Awards	Best Dramatic Performance	Coronation Street	Won	
2001	7th National Television Awards	Most Popular Actress	Coronation Street	Nominated	
2008	14th National Television Awards	Most Popular Newcomer	Casualty	Nominated	
2011	16th National Television Awards	Drama Performance	Casualty	Nominated	
2011	TV Choice Awards	Best Actress	Casualty	Nominated	
2012	17th National Television Awards	Drama Performance: Female	Casualty	Nominated	
2018	Inside Soap Awards	Best Actress	Coronation Street	Nominated	
2018	Digital Spy Reader Awards	Best Soap Actor (Female)	Coronation Street	Eleventh	
2022	27th National Television Awards	Serial Drama Performance	Coronation Street	Nominated	
2022	Inside Soap Awards	Best Actress	Coronation Street	Nominated	
