= Casualty series 6 =

Sixth series of Casualty

Casualty
- Series 6
- Starring: Adie Allen; Maureen Beattie; Ian Bleasdale; Maria Friedman; Robson Green; Mamta Kaash; Anne Kristen; Nigel Le Vaillant; Patrick Robinson; Cathy Shipton; Derek Thompson; Caroline Webster
- No. of episodes: 15

Release
- Original network: BBC One
- Original release: 6 September 1991 – 27 February 1992

Series chronology
- ← Previous; Series 5 Next → Series 7

The sixth series of the British medical drama television series Casualty commenced airing in the United Kingdom on BBC One on 6 September 1991 and finished on 27 February 1992.

== Production ==
Geraint Morris returned to the series once more to develop new storylines after actress Brenda Fricker departed in Series 5. In the opening episode, actors Nigel Le Vaillant, Cathy Shipton and Caroline Webster all performed their own stunts in a daring cliff rescue mission high above the Wye Valley.

The series finale "Cascade" centres on an air crash, and was a technical challenge for designer Andrew Purcell. Three different planes, a scale model and a flight simulator were used to capture the action. A static Hawker Siddeley Trident aircraft G-AVFM owned by Brunel University (formerly owned by British Airways) was used for the close up shots which was based at Bristol Airport. A fake embankment was built around the nose and a bridge added to make it appear as if it had crashed into the bank as the aircraft was not allowed to be damaged during filming. The cabin of a Trident class aircraft at RAF Wroughton was used for the interior scenes. A flight simulator at Gatwick was used for the cockpit scenes whilst filming took place inside a light aircraft landing at Bristol Airport and to show the view seen from the cockpit. A scale model of the aircraft was used to show the landing and the moment the crash happens.

As the episode's original air date was the day before the third anniversary of the Lockerbie disaster, the broadcast was postponed until February 1992.

== Cast ==
=== Overview ===
The sixth series of Casualty features a cast of characters working in the emergency department of Holby City Hospital. The series began with 8 roles with star billing. Nigel Le Vaillant appears as specialist registrar and later, emergency medicine consultant Julian Chapman, while Mamta Kaash plays senior house officer Beth Ramanee. Derek Thompson continues his role as charge nurse Charlie Fairhead, and Cathy Shipton stars as sister Lisa "Duffy" Duffin. Patrick Robinson appears as staff nurse Martin "Ash" Ashford, while Ian Bleasdale and Caroline Webster portray paramedics Josh Griffiths and Jane Scott. Robson Green continues to portray porter Jimmy Powell.

Maureen Beattie, Adie Allen, Anne Kristen and Maria Friedman joined the show's main cast as staff nurse Sandra Nicholl, student nurse Kelly Liddle, receptionist Norma Sullivan and social worker Trish Baynes respectively. Allen and Kristen debuted in episode one, Freidman was introduced in episode three and Beattie began appearing in episode eleven. Allen departed the series in episode nine and Friedman left the cast in episode fifteen. Kaash and Green also left the series in episode fifteen.

=== Main characters ===
- Adie Allen as Kelly Liddle (episodes 1−9)
- Maureen Beattie as Sandra Nicholl (from episode 11)
- Ian Bleasdale as Josh Griffiths
- Maria Friedman as Trish Baynes (episodes 3−15)
- Robson Green as Jimmy Powell (until episode 15)
- Mamta Kaash as Beth Ramanee (until episode 15)
- Anne Kristen as Norma Sullivan (from episode 1)
- Nigel Le Vaillant as Julian Chapman
- Patrick Robinson as Martin "Ash" Ashford
- Cathy Shipton as Lisa "Duffy" Duffin
- Derek Thompson as Charlie Fairhead
- Caroline Webster as Jane Scott

== Episodes ==
No. overall	No. in series	Title	Directed by	Written by	Original release date	UK viewers (millions)
66	1	"Humpty Dumpty"	Jim Hill	Ginnie Hole	6 September 1991	>12.0
A group of young outward bounders tackle a sheer rock face and fall to a cliff base. Specialist registrar Julian Chapman (Nigel Le Vaillant) and sister Lisa "Duffy" Duffin (Cathy Shipton) are winched to the scene by helicopter and Julian performs an emergency amputation on a boy's foot. Paramedic Jane Scott (Caroline Webster) abseils down to help the other victim. Back at Holby, senior house officer Beth Ramanee (Mamta Kaash) respects the wishes of a dying cancer sufferer by not prolonging his life. His daughter (Felicity Montagu) arrives following his death and accuses her father's partner of murder and Beth of negligence.
67	2	"Judgement Day" (Note: See also "Judgement Day" series 17)	Margy Kinmonth	Barbara Machin	13 September 1991	—
Beth faces a coroner's inquest into the cancer patient that she did not resuscitate. No negligence is found but the daughter intends to sue privately. Porter Jimmy Powell (Robson Green), who is moonlighting at a market stall, brings a child into the department after she is burnt following an accident involving a portable gas fire. An athletics coach (Tom Georgeson) brings his star sprinter (Sophie Okonedo) into the ED after they sprain their ankle and have palpitations. A policewoman collapses in the street and Duffy discovers that the cause is a retained tampon.
68	3	"Dangerous Games" (Note: See also "Dangerous Games" series 19)	Charles McDougall	Robin Mukherjee	20 September 1991	13.08
Julian discovers that he has a chance at getting the consultants job. Charge nurse Charlie Fairhead (Derek Thompson) bonds with social worker Trish Baynes (Maria Friedman) after meeting at bereavement counseling. Staff help a young man and a runaway girl suffering from carbon monoxide poisoning, while an 18-year-old male is admitted after almost drowning in a swimming pool. Student nurse Kelly Liddle (Adie Allen) comforts a shoplifter and is devastated to discover that her baby died as a result of neglect. After falling from a playground slide, a child is admitted; while visiting the child, her father (Jim Carter) has an epileptic seizure.
69	4	"Hide and Seek" (Note: See also "Hide and Seek" series 1)	Jim Hill	David Richard-Fox	27 September 1991	13.65
Julian worries about the competition for the consultant position. When a patient (Benjamin Whitrow) is admitted with a snake bite, his snake escapes his bag, forcing Jimmy to find it. Two children, Kasha Lewis (Karen Salt) and Jamie McBride (J.J. Flynn), are admitted after being trapped in a fridge dumped by Kasha's father, Steve Lewis (John McGlynn). Jamie, who is asthmatic, is taken to the Intensive Treatment Unit in a critical condition. A heavy drinking antiques dealer (Tom Chadbon) dies in CRASH after suffering a haemorrhage which covers Beth in blood. Kelly allows Jimmy to practice first aid on her, much to Duffy's disapproval.
70	5	"Joy Ride"	Steve Goldie	Bill Gallagher	4 October 1991	—
Three drunk teenagers play traffic-light jumping in a stolen car. They crash: one is hurled through the windscreen and dies in CRASH; another is badly injured; and the other teenager faces the police. A bride-to-be (Rebecca Lacey) is admitted after losing two fingers in an abattoir, however, they are reattached. A neurotic wife (Polly James) confesses to Trish that she struggles with her husband's sex demands. A workaholic (Paul Barber) is admitted after being nearly blinded by molten plastic, while a man is admitted after being discovered in the street by a policeman; he has lost his memory. Later, the police discover that he may be connected to a fatal stabbing. Kelly is reprimanded by Duffy after giving a tetanus jab without permission.
71	6	"Something to Hide"	Steve Goldie	Stephen Wyatt	11 October 1991	—
A car bomb planted by an Animal Rights activist causes chaos in a suburban street. An injured girl, Judy Harris (Alison Fielding), admits that she is responsible for the bombing after discovering that a man has died as a result of her actions. Kelly and Duffy argue over Kelly's right to confidentiality. Charlie urges a teacher, who is beaten after cruising in a gay area, to contact the police, but he is too afraid. Beth suspects a young man may have multiple sclerosis after he develops a numbness in his arms. The lead star in receptionist Norma Sullivan's (Anne Kristen) amateur dramatics society is admitted after twisiting his ankle.
72	7	"Beggars Can't Be Choosers"	Alan Wareing	Ginnie Hole	18 October 1991	—
A man suffering from severe kidney pain is refused admission by the medical registrar, much to Beth's annoyance. He is later admitted in with septicaemia. A teenage drug addict, Chris Miller (Kieran O'Brien), is admitted after overdosing on temazepam. It emerges that his elderly aunt, Grace Harper (Edna Doré), is supplying him with drugs, believing that they are harmless. Julian warns Chris' parents, Yvonne Miller (Patti Love) and Ted Miller (Barrie Rutter), that he is at risk of hepatitis and AIDS; upset, Ted attacks Grace. Beth discovers the negligence suit is being dropped. Relieved, she breaks down and Charlie comforts her. Kelly is late for her shift, upsetting Duffy, while Julian is pleased to discover he is being promoted to consultant.
73	8	"Living in Hope"	Margy Kinmonth	Robin Mukherjee	25 October 1991	—
Julian celebrates his promotion, while Duffy's boyfriend, Paul (Bill Armstrong), pressures her to leave nursing. A young woman riding her bike down a country lane collides with a heavy goods lorry. The team cannot save her severely damaged right leg. Staff nurse Martin "Ash" Ashford (Patrick Robinson) is punched and insulted in reception whilst trying to settle an argument between a young woman (Julia Sawalha) and her partner. Two student backpackers are admitted after swallowing condoms stuffed with heroin. The boy collapses, but is saved, while the girl collapses and dies in the department toilets after persuading Kelly to let her go to the toilets. Duffy and Charlie warn Kelly about her lax attitude, but she snaps back and walks out of the department.
74	9	"Making the Break"	Jim Hill	Jacqueline Holborough	1 November 1991	15.33
A drunk man (Jimmy Jewel) upsets the team with his attitude after he injures his leg falling down the pub steps. His other leg is wooden. Trish focuses on a boy with human bite marks on his leg. It emerges that his father's friend forced him to be involved in a human dog fight. A nun (Selina Cadell) is admitted after fracturing her nose in a fight with her fellow nun, while a young blind girl is admitted after being hit by a bike, causing her to regain her sight. A young girl finds her alcoholic mother collapsed in her bedroom; the mother dies in CRASH, while her workaholic husband arrives, unemotional at the loss of his wife. Charlie talks Kelly again, but she becomes disillusioned with her job throughout the shift and cries in the toilets. At home, Kelly takes a lethal cocktail of medication and vodka.
75	10	"Sins of Omission"	Alan Wareing	Bryan Elsley	8 November 1991	15.68
The team are devastated by the news of Kelly's suicide, especially Duffy and Ash, who are shocked to learn she was prescribed antidepressants. Duffy blames herself for being too critical on Kelly. An elderly lady (Peggy Mount) with a heart condition arrives in a cheery mood. Ash is on half-hourly observation medicine checks, but the department becomes busy. As he checks on her, she has a seizure and dies. Jimmy befriends a vagabond, who is living in the hospital basement, posing as a porter at mealtimes. A kit-car designer with financial issues takes an insurance man on a test run in his prototype car; the car crashes and the designer suffers a broken leg, while his passenger has multiple injuries. A teenage boy (Charlie Condou) returns to his mother’s (Charlotte Cornwell) home after six months of living rough. He rows with his mother’s boyfriend (Neil Dudgeon) and ends up being pushed through a glass door. Trish tries to persuade his mother to take him back, but she refuses and leaves. Duffy's babysitter is unable to babysit, leaving Paul to look after her son, Peter Duffin (Sam Howells-Pugh). Duffy and Paul argue after her shift because he could not work.
76	11	"The Last Word"	Michael Owen Morris	Barbara Machin	15 November 1991	15.96
Sandra Nicholl (Maureen Beattie) rejoins the team after having a daughter. Jimmy and Julian are attracted to her. Sandra treats a HIV+ woman (Minnie Driver) with a bleeding forehead. She does not use gloves and questions Charlie about the risks. A lorry with three workers, Michael Letts (Colin Tierney), Cliff Davies (Chris Gascoyne) and Mal Wilkinson (Gerard Horan), crashes. Cliff is seriously injured and is about to be taken to surgery when he has a cardiac tamponade. Julian operates on him, which is successful, however he later dies. A ballet dancer (Hermione Norris) arrives with rectal bleeding. Ash learns she is on a diet of tissues and laxatives. Duffy refuses to quit nursing and ends her relationship with Paul.
77	12	"Pressure! What Pressure?"	Michael Brayshaw	Arthur McKenzie	29 November 1991	16.06
A woman (Siobhan Redmond) with self-inflicted cigarette burns discharges herself but is beaten by her husband when she returns home. She has violent abdominal pains on being readmitted to the department and Beth diagnoses ectopic pregnancy. Beth is enraged by the woman's husband and slaps him across the face in the interview room. An obese man with a sprained ankle pleads to have his jaw wired to stop his over-eating. Two young men experiment with glue sniffing; one man dies in CRASH after being he is left at the ED entrance by the other man. Charlie and Julian clash over the ethics of organ donation.
78	13	"Facing Up" (Note: See also "Facing Up" series 12, "Facing Up" series 19 & "Face Up" series 23)	Bill Pryde	Bill Gallagher	6 December 1991	15.17
A young boy finds his father's revolver and shoots his grandmother; she later dies in CRASH from the wound. Paramedics Jane and Josh Griffiths (Ian Bleasdale) have trouble enticing a mentally ill man into the ambulance after he spills hot fat over himself while his daughter’s (Kathy Burke) back is turned. A retired gardener dislocates a rival gardener's jaw after he suspects him of ruining his prize winning leeks. Trish is attacked in her office by an angry client (Anna Cropper) whom she's powerless to help. She feels she must move on. Ash's sister, Francis Ashford (Valerie Hunkins) visits him after an argument with their mother. Beth has an interview for a general practitioner (GP) position but finds racism present at the surgery.
79	14	"Allegiance"	Alan Wareing	David Richard-Fox	13 December 1991	15.48
A tabloid photographer (Gary Olsen) crashes through the glass conservatory roof of a womanising MP (Simon Shepherd) trying to take a photo. The MP's wife is crushed and the two men end up fighting in the ED. A middle aged gay businessman (Frank Windsor) faces life without his partner, who has suffered a fatal heart attack. The partner's daughter arrives and is hostile to their lifestyle. An aging rock guitarist (Brian Hibbard) electrocutes himself on an amplifier; his injuries are superficial but his career is over. Beth is offered the GP position.
80	15	"Cascade"	Michael Owen Morris	Ginnie Hole	27 February 1992	—
Horror strikes at Holby Airport when a plane full of holidaymakers returning from Greece crashes into an embankment. The team is off duty enjoying Beth's leaving party but are soon on red alert to help the victims. Julian and Ash assist at the scene helping a man (Billy Murray) and a 7 year old girl trapped in the cabin. Back at the ED, Beth, Charlie and Duffy deal with the intake of casualties through the night: the co-pilot (Ben Daniels) who is crushed by the controls; and an elderly woman (Rosalie Crutchley) who is trampled on in the rush to leave the plane. The elderly woman has chest and pelvic injuries and dies in CRASH. Her husband searches for her at the accident site but collapses with chest pains. Ash and Charlie ponder the hospital's future as a trust hospital, while Jimmy reveals that he is leaving for a job driving a van. He is hired, although he omits to mention that he cannot drive.

== Bibliography ==
- Kingsley, Hilary (1995). Casualty: The Inside Story. Penguin Books. ISBN 0-14-024902-8.
