= Casualty series 7 =

Seventh series of Casualty

Casualty
- Series 7
- Starring: Maureen Beattie; Emma Bird; Ian Bleasdale; Robert Daws; Joanna Foster; William Gaminara; Anne Kristen; Nigel Le Vaillant; Clive Mantle; Jason Riddington; Patrick Robinson; Cathy Shipton; Derek Thompson; Caroline Webster
- No. of episodes: 24

Release
- Original network: BBC One
- Original release: 12 September 1992 – 27 February 1993

Series chronology
- ← Previous; Series 6 Next → Series 8

The seventh series of the British medical drama television series Casualty commenced airing in the United Kingdom on BBC One on 12 September 1992 and finished on 27 February 1993.

== Production ==
Geraint Morris continued as producer of this series. Due to the success of Casualty by 1992, it was proposed to reformat the series to twice weekly episodes with a 30 minute runtime. However, the BBC opted to increase the number of episodes to 24 and move the show to a Saturday night 8:00pm slot. Varying stories were covered including child abuse, surrogacy and organ donation to a yacht crash and a fall from an electricity pylon.

The final episode of the series "Boiling Point", written by Peter Bowker, was controversial in its depiction of violence where youths set fire to the hospital. Bowker's inspiration for the episode was based on personal experiences of adolescent crime and the desire for vigilante justice; "This became a story of how revenge just escalates violence and in my story this culminated in the burning down of the hospital." Bowing to public pressure, the BBC moved the broadcast from its scheduled time of 7:50pm to the later time of 9:30pm due to its scenes of 'power and impact'. Despite this, it attracted a record audience of 17.02 million but also multiple complaints that it was too violent.

In March 1993, BBC1 Controller Alan Yentob acknowledged that airing the episode had been a misjudgment; "On this occasion Casualty and the Casualty team didn't get it right". As a result, when the series was later repeated, three of its more controversial episodes, including "Boiling Point" were omitted from broadcast. Bowker and the production team defended the episode, citing documented cases of arson to support their position that the storyline reflected the real-world consequences of indiscriminate violence.

== Cast ==
=== Overview ===
The seventh series of Casualty features a cast of characters working in the emergency department of Holby City Hospital. The series began with 8 roles with star billing. Nigel Le Vaillant stars as emergency medicine consultant Julian Chapman. Derek Thompson continues his role as charge nurse Charlie Fairhead, while Cathy Shipton plays sister Lisa "Duffy" Duffin. Patrick Robinson and Maureen Beattie appear as staff nurses Martin "Ash" Ashford and Sandra Nicholl. Ian Bleasdale and Caroline Webster portray paramedics Josh Griffiths and Jane Scott. Anne Kristen continues to portray receptionist Norma Sullivan. Additional cast who appear in a recurring capacity included Imogen Boorman, Nicola Jefferies and Ken Sharrock who portray Ash's girlfriend Nikki Wyatt, receptionist Jenny and Maxine's dad Kevin Price respectively.

Joanna Foster, Jason Riddington and Emma Bird were introduced in episode one as staff general manager Kate Miller, senior house officer Rob Khalefa and healthcare assistant Maxine Price. Robert Daws joined the cast in episode six as administrator Simon Eastman while Clive Mantle began appearing as emergency medicine consultant Mike Barratt in episode nineteen. Registrar Andrew Bower (William Gaminara) was reintroduced in episode sixteen, having previously appeared in series 4. Foster departed the series in episode eight, while Riddington, Bird, Daws and Gaminara left at the conclusion of the series. Le Vaillant and Beattie chose to leave the show, with Le Vaillant departing in episode fourteen and Beattie departing in episode twenty-four.

=== Main characters ===
- Maureen Beattie as Sandra Nicholl (until episode 24)
- Emma Bird as Maxine Price (episodes 1−24)
- Ian Bleasdale as Josh Griffiths
- Robert Daws as Simon Eastman (episodes 6−24)
- Joanna Foster as Kate Miller (episodes 1−8)
- William Gaminara as Andrew Bower (episodes 16−24)
- Anne Kristen as Norma Sullivan
- Nigel Le Vaillant as Julian Chapman (until episode 14)
- Clive Mantle as Mike Barratt (from episode 19)
- Jason Riddington as Rob Khalefa (episodes 1−24)
- Patrick Robinson as Martin "Ash" Ashford
- Cathy Shipton as Lisa "Duffy" Duffin
- Derek Thompson as Charlie Fairhead
- Caroline Webster as Jane Scott

=== Recurring and guest characters ===
- Imogen Boorman as Nikki Wyatt (episodes 3−18)
- Nicola Jefferies as Jenny (episodes 2−13)
- Ken Sharrock as Kevin Price (episodes 20−22)
- Roshan Seth as Sujit Pratkash (episode 1)

== Episodes ==
| No. overall | No. in series | Title | Directed by | Written by | Original release date | UK viewers (millions) |
|---|---|---|---|---|---|---|
| 81 | 1 | "Rates of Exchange" | Alan Wareing | Barbara Machin | 12 September 1992 | — |
Two men (Mark Powley and Jimmi Harkishin) are injured when their car overturns, swerving to avoid a lorry. The driver dies and his parents (Julia Foster and Roshan Seth) and partner (Tracie Bennett) have different opinions about organ donation. Nervous new SHO Rob Khalefa nearly kills the injured passenger by failing to insert a second drip and misses his fractured pelvis. Ash takes pity on a homeless girl (Kelly Marcel) who has slit her wrists. Her mother turns out to be a well-known prostitute in Holby. New HCA Max falls foul of Duffy when she wears a bum bag and chews gum whilst on duty. Note: Title Sequence (pulse line) changed
| 82 | 2 | "Cry Wolf" | Michael Owen Morris | David Richard-Fox | 19 September 1992 | — |
Seconds after an accident involving a young lad (Paul Reynolds) on a motorbike, off-duty paramedic Josh arrives at the scene. While Josh calls for help, an interfering GP removes the boy's crash helmet, putting his spinal cord at risk. Josh counsels the boy's father (Ian Hogg). Holby's general manager Kate Miller shadows a shift in the department. A toddler needs his stomach pumped after swallowing cannabis which his father left lying around. Sandra believes she spots an attention seeker (Mary Jo Randle) but Julian discovers the patient's real problem is an obstructed bowel. By then she has fled and is later brought back in after collapsing.
| 83 | 3 | "Body Politic" | Michael Owen Morris | Ginnie Hole | 26 September 1992 | — |
A teenage girl is brought in by her anxious mother (Jan Harvey), unaware her daughter is pregnant. The girl confesses to Max that she has tried to end the pregnancy with a knitting needle. It becomes clear that the mother's boyfriend has been abusing her. An aristocrat is shot by a biker with a crossbow when he answers the front door. No surgeons are available and Julian is forced to operate in CRASH to remove the bolt while his wife (Anna Chancellor) is questioned by the police. He saves the man. The attacker turns out to be the mother of a child the aristocrat killed on the road eight years before. A body builder arrives with a sore throat. Norma dismisses him as not being serious. Max discovers him collapsed in the hospital grounds and he is rushed to CRASH but dies. Ash and Rob find steroids in his wallet. Norma worries about her mother who has Alzheimer's.
| 84 | 4 | "Will You Still Love Me?" | Bill Pryde | Helen Greaves | 3 October 1992 | — |
A young boy, frightened into silence by his mother's (Susan Brown) affair is brought in with a sore throat. He later collapses outside with his father (Peter Wight) and dies in CRASH. Julian mistakenly breaks the news to mother Julie and her lover, Mike (Jesse Birdsall). An unhappy old woman, Dorothy (Eleanor Summerfield), claims staff at her nursing home have beaten her. She shows Duffy bruises on her leg which are found to be self-inflicted. Her son (James Aubrey) arrives to find she lied so she could live with him. A teenage girl, Rachel, is injured when she is hit by a car. While in a cubicle, a fake doctor assaults Rachel – and her overbearing father, Bob (Michael N. Harbour), makes matters worse and discharges her from the hospital. A middle-aged man, George comes in with his wife (Anne Reid), suffering from chest pains. Julian diagnoses a minor condition and suggests a larger gardening jacket. Kate finds £8,000 discrepancies with the hospital budget – Charlie is not happy to spend the shift sorting it out only to find it was a written error. Julian is trying to find someone to play squash with him, after his partner drops out. Nikki comes to see Ash to say their electricity has been cut.
| 85 | 5 | "Cherish" | Alan Wareing | Catherine Johnson | 10 October 1992 | — |
A young couple are brought in after a minor motorbike accident. The boy turns out to be a cross-dressing female (Nicola Cowper), which "his" girlfriend was unaware of. An elderly lady (Dora Bryan) is admitted after pretending to faint when caught shoplifting. She falls on her sister's (Betty Marsden) leg, and during his investigations Julian discovers she has cancer. A pregnant Asian woman (Kim Vithana) throws herself down the stairs to try and cause a miscarriage, wrongly believing her husband won't want the child if it's a girl. She goes into labour in the hospital toilet and Julian and Sandra help her give birth to a healthy baby boy. A girl becomes frustrated at caring for her mother (Ruth Sheen), who has ME, and accidentally cuts her mother's face with a kitchen knife. Norma is sympathetic towards the girl, especially when her own mother is brought in after being found wandering the streets and fails to recognize her.
| 86 | 6 | "Profit and Loss" | Michael Brayshaw | Stephen Wyatt | 17 October 1992 | — |
Maxine organises a karaoke as a fundraiser where Sandra convinces Julian to sing a duet with her. Ash takes Nikki along but she feels out of place. General manager Simon Eastman visits the department to take Kate to task for going over budget by letting Charlie hire agency nurses. The owner (Michael Jayston) of a failing business sets fire to the premises for the insurance but, unknown to him and his wife (Stephanie Turner), his son (Nicholas Gleaves) has returned to the building and is badly burned. A middle-aged couple, Lionel and Maria (Helen Lederer and Peter Gilmore), attempt to gas themselves in their car in a suicide pact: Lionel has debilitating motor neuron disease. Josh and Jane save Maria but Lionel dies. Maria's sister (Ann Bell) thanks Josh but when he visits Maria she says she wishes he'd let her die.
| 87 | 7 | "One Step Forward" | Michael Brayshaw | Peter Bowker | 24 October 1992 | — |
A disagreement between two elderly men (Leslie Randall and Lionel Jeffries) results in a bicycle accident, a mentally disabled girl cuts her hand after an argument with Ash, Julian has to save a squash player (Suzette Llewellyn) whose neck is impaled on her broken racquet and a father asks the staff to replace his daughter's front tooth so she can appear in a play. Duffy worries when a smear test proves inconclusive and Julian admits to married Sandra that he is attracted to her.
| 88 | 8 | "Body and Soul" | Bill Pryde | Peter Bowker | 31 October 1992 | — |
Jane spends a shift in Casualty on a refresher course. Simon has Kate transferred away from the hospital and takes over the running of the department himself, overturning her decisions. A hunt saboteur is hit in the head by a horse and dies while the rider (Tenniel Evans) is hospitalised and the horse has to be put down. A woman who has been raped gets into trouble when she slashes a stranger's (James Purefoy) face with her keys and a teenage girl turns up after a homemade tattoo becomes septic. Duffy is booked in for a biopsy and Sandra convinces Julian to help her avoid the queue. Afterwards, Julian and Sandra kiss.
| 89 | 9 | "Tender Loving Care" | Alan Wareing | Barbara Machin | 7 November 1992 | — |
A Jewish man (Harry Towb) collapses from angina during a synagogue service. He is given the all clear in hospital but as they are leaving his wife (Maxine Audley) collapses from an aortic aneurysm and dies. A teenager, bullied by a classmate (Jonny Lee Miller) falls ill from an overdose of sickle cell medication on a school trip after his teacher rejects his advances. A man named Adam has an asthma attack while threatening his estranged wife Catherine. He tells Maxine he is allergic to penicillin and she adds it to his notes. Rob sets up an IV drip without checking and gets Sandra to administer it against protocol when he is called away, causing Adam to fall ill. Catherine stops Adam making a complaint by threatening to report him for assault but Charlie orders an internal investigation.
| 90 | 10 | "Money Talks" | Michael Owen Morris | Bryan Elsley | 14 November 1992 | 16.21 |
An electricity worker, Fred, is on his last day before retiring. He and his partner Alan (Alex Walkinshaw) find a man has electrocuted himself after climbing a pylon. Fred follows Alan up to retrieve the body without a harness and falls, being rushed to hospital in a bad way. His frantic wife (Marcia Warren) arrives soon after. Sandra is unhappy at being held responsible for the medication mistake and constantly questions Rob's instructions. A teenage girl is brought in after collapsing at a party but Rob thinks she is just drunk and ignores Sandra's concerns. Sandra calls Julian, who is off duty. Julian comes to the hospital and has the girl rushed into Crash, since she has actually taken ecstasy. He tears a strip off Rob but his credibility is damaged by his affair with Sandra.
| 91 | 11 | "Making Waves" | Michael Brayshaw | Robin Mukherjee | 21 November 1992 | 16.10 |
Rob goes on a boating trip with his girlfriend Natasha and her parents (Martin Jarvis and Rosalind Ayres). Natasha's father Bart crashes the boat and Natasha is swept away, being found washed up on a beach some time later. Josh has to be rescued from quicksand while coming to their aid. A recovering drug addict collapses from septicaemia from old needle marks. Charlie is furious when her boyfriend visits and persuades her to take another hit, especially since he is HIV positive and shared a needle. Duffy's biopsy results are negative.
| 92 | 12 | "If It Isn't Hurting" | Bill Pryde | Jacqueline Holborough | 28 November 1992 | — |
A farmer facing bankruptcy initiates a siege during which he shoots both his children, killing one and injuring the other, and injures himself. A cantankerous wheelchair-using man (Philip Madoc) cuts his hand and his wife ends up abandoning him at the hospital. A traffic warden (Ellen Thomas) has her earring ripped out on her first day; the driver later apologises but she decides to quit anyway. Sandra gets a written warning for her mistake and is unable to seek comfort from Julian because her husband is in town. Julian is angry when Simon spends money on refurbishing conference rooms despite a lack of beds in ITU.
| 93 | 13 | "Act of Faith" | Alan Wareing | Catherine Johnson | 5 December 1992 | 16.64 |
Julian takes Sandra's daughter Laura to the circus. While they are watching, a trapeze artist falls and badly injures himself and Julian is forced to step in to treat him; Josh and Jane see Laura with him. The trapeze artist is the son of the circus owner (Rula Lenska) who turns up at the hospital. A pregnant woman named Annabel (Kelly Hunter) is brought in after being beaten up by her boyfriend Nick. A couple named Russel and Hattie (Michael Simpkins and Susan Penhaligon) accompany her: She is acting as a surrogate mother for them. Annabel reveals her own children were taken into care after she beat them and she now wants to keep the baby, prompting Hettie to lose interest in adopting her child. Julian is frustrated when Simon has deputy receptionist Jenny transferred and wants to cut the number of doctors in the department.
| 94 | 14 | "Point of Principle" | Michael Owen Morris | Peter Bowker | 19 December 1992 | — |
Two cyclists are brought in after being involved in a collision. A man turns up with severe gashes after trying to break up a dog fight in which his pet was killed; Duffy convinces him to reject the friends who organised the fight. A teenage girl is fed up of her father pressuring her to be an ice skater rather than study law so she deliberately lets a car run over her foot. The department loses a bid for a new trauma unit and Ash contacts the press. Julian makes a statement to the journalists in which he resigns. Simon tells him to leave immediately and he departs in front of the journalists after a farewell to Sandra.
| 95 | 15 | "Silent Night" (Note: See also "Silent Night" series 21) | Michael Brayshaw | Ginnie Hole | 24 December 1992 | — |
A woman is brought in after taking an overdose at a Christmas party. She reveals she is pregnant but her boyfriend dumped her and gave her money for an abortion. She leaves the hospital against advice and goes back to the party only to see her ex having fun without her. Maxine asks Rob to give homeless teenage runaway Suzie (Rebecca Callard) a bed for Christmas but Charlie insists she is discharged. She runs away from the hospital just before her father turns up, and runs in front of an ambulance. Jane, who was driving, suffers whiplash and Suzie escapes with minor injuries. Rob and Maxine share a kiss. A violent pensioner, Arthur (T. P. McKenna), is angry when his son (Jeff Rawle) refuses to bring his family for Christmas and beats his wife (Dorothy Tutin), who stabs him. He dies from his injuries meaning his wife will be charged with murder.
| 96 | 16 | "The Ties That Bind" (Note: See also "The Ties That Bind" series 13, "The Ties That Bind" series 17, "The Ties That Bind" series 26 & "The Ties That Bind Us" series 19) | Michael Brayshaw | Stephen Wyatt | 2 January 1993 | — |
Nikki tells Ash she is pregnant. A divorced father kidnaps his daughter but has to take her to the hospital when she falls ill. A woman (Amanda Redman) is brought in with a fractured wrist: When her husband arrives, he discovers the female colleague who accompanied her is actually her lover. Jerry is supposed to be getting married but his best man Don is hungover. While trying to sober him up, Jerry stops Don walking into the water but Don punches him, causing him to hit his head. At the hospital, Don admits to Jerry's fiancée Lynn (Susannah Corbett) that he is in love with her. Duffy is annoyed when Charlie tells her the locum consultant is Andrew Bower, her ex-boyfriend and the father of her son Peter.
| 97 | 17 | "Life in the Fast Lane" | Tom Cotter | Susan Wilkins | 9 January 1993 | — |
Drunk driver Paul (Hywel Bennett) drives through a red light and runs over three youngsters. Andrew heads to the scene but is unable to save one of the trio, Mark, a new father. Mark's sister Sara is angry with him. Paul is taken to hospital after claiming to be another victim but is arrested when Sara recognizes him. Depressed teenager Emily (Clare Woodgate) is brought in after taking an overdose of paracetamol and is found to have terminal liver damage. A middle-aged black man (Ram John Holder) gets into an altercation with a neighbour over parking spaces on their street in which they both suffer minor injuries and tries to get his daughter onside by claiming the woman was racist towards him. Andrew meets Peter for the first time when he picks him up in reception, not realising who he is until he sees Duffy looking at him.
| 98 | 18 | "Everybody Needs Somebody" | Michael Owen Morris | Arthur Mckenzie | 16 January 1993 | — |
Kevin (Stephen Moore), a troubled man studying to be a barrister, attempts suicide by slitting his wrists and gassing himself in his front room. When Josh and Jane arrive on the scene, he tries to strangle Josh, who ends up needing medical attention. An elderly farmer, Harry (Jack Walters), argues with his nephew Billy (Victor Winding), before having his legs shredded when he kicks a rock out of a blocked tractor blade. He dies in Crash. Nikki tells Ash she has had an abortion. Andrew tells the staff that a permanent consultant, Mike Barratt, has been appointed and thanks them for their support.
| 99 | 19 | "Getting Involved" | Marcus D.F. White | Sam Snape | 23 January 1993 | — |
A woman (Julia Hills) arrives with knife wounds to her breasts. Her husband (Con O'Neill) turns up and is aggressive, having to be restrained by Rob and newly arrived Mike. The staff believe she is being abused but in fact she inflicted the wounds herself, because of her post-natal depression. A busy couple (Paula Wilcox and Michael Cashman) leave their son home alone after school and he suffers an electric shock from a faulty kettle. Jane, who was neglected by her own parents, takes it upon herself to lecture them. Duffy and Andrew have dinner together after the shift and share a kiss. Two elderly ladies (Noel Dyson and Ursula Howells) need the help of the team when one of them collapses in an argument over an old romantic rivalry.
| 100 | 20 | "Dividing Loyalties" | Alan Wareing | Robin Mukherjee | 30 January 1993 | — |
A runaway schoolboy is brought in after being injured and it transpires his teacher has been bullying him because he is obsessed with the boy's mother (Cindy O'Callaghan). An unemployed father is convinced by his brother-in-law to take part in a ram raid but his wife and daughter are visiting the electric shop they ram; seeing them, he swerves and crashes the van, killing the gang leader. His daughter dies of her injuries after being hit by falling rubble. Maxine is visited by her father who reveals he has a new girlfriend the same age as her. Ash is promoted to senior staff nurse but Charlie walks away from the celebratory drinks.
| 101 | 21 | "Family Matters" (Note: See also "Family Matters" series 20 & "Family Matters" series 27) | Tom Cotter | Robin Mukherjee | 6 February 1993 | — |
A pre-teen girl is brought in by her brother and his girlfriend (Kate Winslet) with bleeding and it is discovered she has been sexually abused. Her parents (John Duttine and Elizabeth Estensen) rush to the hospital. Her father is suspected until the true culprit is revealed as her teenage brother, apparently copying the abuse he received from their father. Two tramps are mugged by a group of teens and, when one of them dies from his wounds, the teens are charged with murder. A woman fakes illness so her boyfriend (Alexander Hanson) can steal medical equipment. Norma is in a quiet mood after her mother's funeral.
| 102 | 22 | "Child's Play" | Marcus D.F. White | Jacqueline Holborough | 13 February 1993 | — |
A rent boy is gang raped. Rob is disappointed by Charlie's lack of sympathy and encourages the man to go to the police. A mentally ill man is reluctant to take his medication, despite his son's protests. A schoolgirl who is having an affair with her teacher is bullied by her dorm mates, who violently give her the birthday bumps and break her back, leaving her disabled. A disdainful Mike informs the teacher that she is pregnant with his child. Maxine meets her father's new young girlfriend, Shelley, and is unimpressed. At the end of the shift, Charlie, who has been diagnosed with depression, breaks down in front of Duffy.
| 103 | 23 | "No Cause for Concern" | Alan Wareing | Bryan Elsley | 20 February 1993 | — |
Two overworked seamen are assigned a pair of Chinese ratings with little English. One of them misunderstands instructions and passes out in a hold full of toxic fumes; the first officer, Han, who has left a cut hand untreated because he is afraid to take time off, falls from a ladder while trying to rescue him. The rating dies in hospital and Han convinces his captain (Julian Holloway) they are being overworked. Two youths unknowingly steal a van full of radioactive isotopes and crash it. The van explodes, killing one of them and showering the other with radioactive debris. He is taken to hospital before the truth is discovered and the staff who treated him, along with Josh and Jane, who picked him up, have to go through decontamination. Sandra walks out mid-shift, unconvinced by assurances they are safe.
| 104 | 24 | "Boiling Point" | Michael Owen Morris | Peter Bowker | 27 February 1993 | 17.02 |
Duffy and Andrew are getting married in the morning, Maxine tells Charlie she is going to become a nurse and it's Rob's last shift before he takes up a surgical post in Southampton. A gang of youths burgle a house and beat up a pensioner, Ray. Ray's son Gordon (Michael Angelis) contacts some neighbours who form a vigilante group: A violent clash with the youths results in Errol, a man whose son has joined the gang, being stabbed. Casualties from both sides are taken to hospital but when they are ejected for causing trouble the youths start a fire in the basement and blow up an ambulance in the main entrance. The staff and patients are successfully evacuated but Rob disobeys instructions and tries to get the body of Ray, who died earlier from a heart attack, out of the department; he is buried under rubble and his legs are crushed. Errol dies of his injuries in the car park. Charlie vows to rebuild the department. The full script for the episode can be read on the BBC website.

== Bibliography ==
- Kingsley, Hilary (1995). Casualty: The Inside Story. Penguin Books. ISBN 0-14-024902-8.
