= Casualty series 5 =

Fifth series of Casualty

Casualty
- Series 5
- Starring: Eamon Boland; Ian Bleasdale; Brenda Fricker; William Gaminara; Robson Green; Mamta Kaash; Geoffery Leesley; Nigel Le Vaillant; Maggie McCarthy; Patrick Robinson; Cathy Shipton; Derek Thompson; Caroline Webster
- No. of episodes: 13

Release
- Original network: BBC One
- Original release: 7 September – 7 December 1990

Series chronology
- ← Previous; Series 4 Next → Series 6

The fifth series of the British medical drama television series Casualty commenced airing in the United Kingdom on BBC One on 7 September 1990 and finished on 7 December 1990.

== Production ==
Peter Norris continued as producer in Series 5 and courageously chose to expose viewers to harrowing scenarios: a riot at a football stadium, a car race with drunk drivers, a negligent grandfather causing a child's death, a prisoner who has been raped, and an unemployed man driven to murder by jealousy. He trusted that viewers would recognise these events as the horrific consequences of preventable actions.

A new star appeared in the form of Duffy's baby Peter, played by Derek Thompson's real life son Charlie. The series concluded with a dramatic end-of-series cliffhanger where an armed madman, portrayed by Kenneth Cranham, took Megan hostage and ultimately shot Charlie, but would he survive?

== Cast ==
=== Overview ===
The fifth series of Casualty features a cast of characters working in the emergency department of Holby City Hospital. The series began with 6 roles with star billing. Derek Thompson continues his role as charge nurse Charlie Fairhead, Cathy Shipton stars as sister Lisa "Duffy" Duffin, and Brenda Fricker appears as state enrolled nurse Megan Roach. Geoffrey Leesley and Ian Bleasdale portrays paramedics Keith Cotterill and Josh Griffiths, while Robson Green plays porter Jimmy Powell.

Nigel Le Vaillant, Mamta Kaash, Patrick Robinson, Maggie McCarthy and Eamon Boland joined the cast in episode one as registrar Julian Chapman, senior house officer Beth Ramanee, staff nurse Martin "Ash" Ashford, receptionist Helen Green and social worker Tony Walker. Caroline Webster debuted in episode two as paramedic Jane Scott. Boland left the series in episode ten and McCarthy departed in episode thirteen. Leesley chose to leave the series after four years making his final appearance in episode five. Fricker bowed out as Megan in episode thirteen, after playing the character in 65 episodes. Fricker states "People thought I left because I won the Oscar, but I had already decided to go by then. Oscar or no Oscar, Megan didn't develop in the way she was meant to."

=== Main characters ===
- Eamon Boland as Tony Walker (episodes 1−10)
- Ian Bleasdale as Josh Griffiths
- Brenda Fricker as Megan Roach (until episode 13)
- Robson Green as Jimmy Powell
- Mamta Kaash as Beth Ramanee (from episode 1)
- Geoffrey Leesley as Keith Cotterill (until episode 5)
- Nigel Le Vaillant as Julian Chapman (from episode 1)
- Maggie McCarthy as Helen Green (episodes 1−13)
- Patrick Robinson as Martin "Ash" Ashford (from episode 1)
- Cathy Shipton as Lisa "Duffy" Duffin
- Derek Thompson as Charlie Fairhead
- Caroline Webster as Jane Scott (from episode 2)

=== Guest characters ===
- Doreen Mantle as Kate Duffin (episodes 8−9)

== Episodes ==
No. overall	No. in series	Title	Directed by	Written by	Original release date
53	1	"Penalty"	Michael Owen Morris	Ginnie Hole	7 September 1990
A riot at a football match causes a hectic first day for new members of staff, registrar Julian Chapman (Nigel Le Vaillant), staff nurse Martin "Ash" Ashford (Patrick Robinson) and senior house officer Beth Ramanee (Mamta Kaash). One girl (Dervla Kirwan) requires an emergency tracheotomy, while a mother is trampled to death in the mayhem. State enrolled nurse Megan Roach (Brenda Fricker) arrives late for her shift after the funeral of her husband, Ted Roach (Nigel Anthony). Meanwhile, paramedic Keith Cotterill (Geoffrey Leesley) delivers twins.
54	2	"Results"	Andrew Morgan	Ben Aaronovitch	14 September 1990
Keith and new paramedic Jane Scott (Caroline Webster) have their drugs case stolen by drug addicts Melissa (Linda Davidson) and Mike (Jay Simpson). Mike is admitted to A&E after injecting atropine. A young student, Alex (Ben Porter), dies from alcohol poisoning after celebrating passing his exams, devastating his girlfriend (Shirley Henderson). An out of control lorry throws a man, Henry Carpenter (Geoffrey Bateman), through an office window. He dies in CRASH. Charge nurse Charlie Fairhead (Derek Thompson) is depressed after discovering his friend (George Costigan) collapsed and died while recovering with a broken leg.
55	3	"Close to Home"	Alan Wareing	Jim Hill	21 September 1990
Charlie is feeling low following his best friend's death. Julian is tactless but later apologises. Megan is charmed by social worker, Tony Walker (Eamon Boland), who saves her when she is attacked by her neighbour who is neglecting her small son. Two firemen, Ralph Peters (Pete Postlethwaite) and Eddy (Kevin O'Donohoe), are injured after a wall collapses on them. Porter Jimmy Powell (Robson Green) spends most of the shift searching for a stolen briefcase belonging to Mr. Parish (Mark Kingston), admitted after collapsing. On finding it, he is surprised that it contains women's clothing.
56	4	"Street Life"	Jim Hill	Ian Briggs	28 September 1990
Sister Lisa "Duffy" Duffin (Cathy Shipton) spots hepatitis B symptoms in prostitute Jenny Munro (Denise Black), who has human bite marks. Jenny refuses to take Duffy's advice to stay; Jenny is later brought in dead on arrival after being beaten up. Megan worries about two homeless teenage girls, Imogen Wyatt (Robin Weaver) and Nikki (Amelia Shankley), one stabbed in the arm by squatters and the other, seriously ill from a paracetamol overdose. A tyrannical old mother (Elizabeth Bradley), a young man with a sex-mad girlfriend and the husband (Derek Benfield) of a heart patient who is sicker than his wife are also admitted.
57	5	"Hiding Place"	Jim Hill	Tony Etchells	5 October 1990
Charlie witnesses a lorry crushing a man on his way to work. He goes with him in the ambulance, but the man dies in CRASH. A former boxer, Jack Morris (John Bardon), uses his old skills on hooligans on a bus but ends up with broken ribs. Beth and Julian clash over the treatment of a drug addict, while a hoaxer (Michael Feast) poses as a doctor to steal tranquillisers. Tony tempts Megan with a trip to Paris and when Ash warns Megan that Tony is married, she states that she is aware.
58	6	"Salvation"	Michael Owen Morris	Robin Mukherjee	12 October 1990
A girl's legs become crushed when youths race in cars along a dark country road. A father's (Robert Glenister) religious sect opposes dialysis for his daughter, despite the pleas of the mother (Louise Jameson) and an angry Julian. Finally, the father relents. Charlie lets a drunk person (Roger Winslet) sleep on a cubicle bed, much to Julian and Ash's disapproval. When another supposed drunk person is admitted, Charlie sends him to join the other drunk person, but Jimmy calls the alarm when they find out he is a diabetic, who's had a hypo. Porter Harry (Barrie Gosney) is treated by Beth after falling ill. As Beth treats him, he arrests and dies in CRASH.
59	7	"Say it With Flowers"	Alan Wareing	Rona Munro	19 October 1990
A girl (Annabelle Apsion) ends up in A&E after being assaulted by a minicab driver (Mark McGann). Duffy draws on her own rape experience to advise her. An old woman (Hilda Braid) collapses in the street and Megan and Beth discover she's carrying several thousand pounds in her handbag. Sisters Lizzie and Mandy Trent (played by real life sisters Carol and Amanda Royle) are modelling at a press launch for a new range of sweets when Mandy falls and breaks her arm. Lizzie, the older and more experienced of the two, fears that her modelling career is in tatters and takes her anger out on the casualty staff. When Charlie begins to drink heavily, Megan warns him of the risks of drinking. His problem is brought into focus when a social worker drinking buddy (Dona Croll) is rushed in after cutting her wrists.
60	8	"Love's a Pain"	Andrew Morgan	Sam Snape	26 October 1990
A doting grandfather (Denis Lill) climbs a ladder to retrieve a frisbee from the roof for a young boy. He topples backwards crushing the boy who dies in CRASH. Julian's skills save a knifed taxi driver. Police arrest a patient, Gordon Robinson (Patrick Drury), after attacking the lover of his wife, Diane Robinson (Carolyn Pickles). The lover (Nicholas Jones) later dies of a brain haemorrhage. Duffy finds it tough being a single mum and when her babysitter cancels, she is forced to bring her baby son, Peter, to work. Her mother (Doreen Mantle) is able to lend a hand.
61	9	"A Will to Die"	Michael Brayshaw	Christopher Penfold	2 November 1990
A man (Dominic Jephcott) secretly meets his wife's best friend for sex on a canal barge but after an explosion caused by a gas leak, she is left horrifically burned. An anorexic girl (Liza Walker) is admitted with her bossy mother but overdoses in the department toilets and dies in CRASH. Jimmy finds his chess mate pal, alcoholic Frank has been admitted. He refuses to help himself, until his estranged mother (Ann Mitchell) arrives; they are reconciled and she offers him a home. Beth treats a young remand prisoner (David Harewood) who has been beaten up and discovers he has also been raped. Duffy's childcare issues continue.
62	10	"Big Boys Don't Cry" (Note: See also "Boys Don’t Cry" series 19)	Jenny Killick	Ginnie Hole	9 November 1990
Paramedics Josh Griffiths (Ian Bleasdale) and Lily (Susan Colverd) find a dead elderly man and his crazed son, who menaces them with a butcher's knife. Later, he turns up outside A&E, smashes the front doors and threatens Jimmy in the same way before being arrested. The team battle to save Miles Philpott (Jeremy Rampling), a schoolboy who tried to hang himself at school after being bullied. Beth argues and proves to paediatric registrar Esther Macauley (Tessa Peake-Jones) that a bruised baby is not being abused but has brittle bones. Megan is planning to go on a hillwalking holiday with Tony after the shift ends. However, his estranged wife (Dearbhla Molloy) turns up at reception and warns her off him.
63	11	"Remembrance"	Michael Owen Morris	Robin Mukherjee	16 November 1990
Jimmy's latest girlfriend, a student nurse, is admitted after a night of drink-and-drug-taking. Jimmy is suspended when the nurse falsely tells Julian that Jimmy stole the drugs from the department for her. A racist warehouse foreman and a worker are admitted after inhaling chlorine fumes; they survive due to their Sri-Lankan skivvy (Kulvinder Ghir) saving them. At the behest of his wife (Suzanne Bertish), a man (Robert Gwilym) brings in his difficult mother (Jean Anderson) and asks Julian to end her life. A couple, Brian and Jodie (Annette Badland), are found by a landowner sleeping in a shed. He pushes Brian, and he cuts his head. In A&E, as Jodie waits for him to be stitched up, she has stomach pains. The team discover she’s in labour.
64	12	"All's Fair" (Note: See also "All's Fair" series 10, "All's Fair" series 16 & "All's Fair in Love and War" series 20)	Alan Wareing	Stephen Wyatt	30 November 1990
A teenage girl refuses to admit why she tried to kill herself but her older sister (Louise Lombard) informs Megan that their widower father (Christopher Blake) has been sexually abusing the girl. Julian's weekend "war games" are halted when his gaming partner is admitted with an injured ankle. Diabetic Ash helps another diabetic (Geraldine Somerville), while Duffy considers joining a nursing agency. She also counsels a single mother (Dee Sadler) who is struggling with her two sons, one of whom is hit by a van during a game of ‘chicken’.
65	13	"A Reasonable Man"	Andrew Morgan	Barbara Machin	7 December 1990
Megan has written a letter to Tony, but agonises whether to send it. Steven Hills (Christopher Eccleston) comes to A&E; he is HIV positive and is unwell with a chest infection. Ash thinks he is a hopper, but Beth disagrees and tries to advise him when she finds him hiding in the women's toilets. A woman (Joan Blackham) brings her husband in after he is stung by a bee. A schizophrenic man (Kenneth Cranham) arrives after a road accident in which he was hit by a motorcyclist (Ben Chaplin). It transpires he has murdered his wife's male work friend after wrongly believing they were having an affair. He panics at the sight of a policeman and pulls a gun from a briefcase, taking Megan hostage in CRASH. He insists that a porter − Charlie wearing Jimmy's uniform − takes out a dead body on a trolley. Megan remains calm but when the police and the man's wife shout, the man panics and fires the gun, wounding Charlie in the chest.

== Bibliography ==
- Kingsley, Hilary (1995). Casualty: The Inside Story. Penguin Books. ISBN 0-14-024902-8.
