= Casualty series 8 =

Eighth series of Casualty

Casualty
- Series 8
- Starring: Martin Ball; Ian Bleasdale; Doña Croll; Samantha Edmonds; Christopher Guard; Jane Gurnett; Suzanna Hamilton; Anne Kristen; Clive Mantle; Tara Moran; Naoko Mori; Steven O'Donnell; Brendan O'Hea; Oliver Parker; Patrick Robinson; Cathy Shipton; Derek Thompson; Caroline Webster
- No. of episodes: 24

Release
- Original network: BBC One
- Original release: 18 September 1993 – 26 February 1994

Series chronology
- ← Previous; Series 7 Next → Series 9

The eighth series of the British medical drama television series Casualty commenced airing in the United Kingdom on BBC One on 18 September 1993 and finished on 26 February 1994.

== Production ==
With producer Geraint Morris departing, a suitable replacement was found in the form of Michael Ferguson, former producer of The Bill. Following the success of the previous series, 24 new episodes were commissioned, even though several episodes in series 7, particularly the finale, sparked public debate.

A fairground accident, a near-tragedy in a lift and freak storm hitting Holby were among the action scenes. The opening episode "Cat In Hell", continued the graphic and dramatic tone, showcasing a train crashing into a car full of joyriders on a level crossing, before derailing. The stunt cost £750,000 and due to its graphic nature, British Rail banned the BBC from filming it on their network. Instead, scenes were shot at Grosmont railway station on the North Yorkshire Moors Railway.

== Cast ==
=== Overview ===
The eighth series of Casualty features a cast of characters working in the emergency department of Holby City Hospital. The series began with 7 roles with star billing. Clive Mantle starred as emergency medicine consultant Mike Barratt. Derek Thompson continued his role as charge nurse Charlie Fairhead. Cathy Shipton and Patrick Robinson appeared as staff nurses Lisa "Duffy" Duffin and Martin "Ash" Ashford. Ian Bleasdale portrayed paramedic Josh Griffiths while Caroline Webster starred as paramedic and later, general manager Jane Scott. Anne Kristen continued to appear as receptionist Norma Sullivan. Jo Unwin appeared in two episodes as paramedic Lucy Cooper, before joining the recurring cast in episode twenty. Brian Miller appeared in two episodes as Norma's husband, Chris Sullivan. David Ryall also appeared in four episodes as locum emergency medicine consultant Tom Harley.

This series saw several new cast members join the series. Oliver Parker, Suzanna Hamilton, Doña Croll and Christopher Guard were introduced in the first episode as surgical manager Mark Calder, senior house officer Karen Goodliffe, staff nurse Adele Beckford and clinical nurse specialist Ken Hodges. Parker departed in episode eighteen; Hamilton left in episode seventeen; Croll departed at the conclusion of the series; and Guard left in episode seven. Samantha Edmonds, Naoko Mori and Steven O'Donnell joined the cast in the second episode as project 2000 nurse Helen Chatsworth, receptionist Mie Nishi-Kawa and porter Frankie Drummer. Edmonds left the series in episode ten and Mori and O'Donnell departed in episode twenty-four. Brendan O'Hea first appeared in episode nine as paramedic Brian Crawford. He departed in episode nineteen. Tara Moran was introduced in episode twelve as trainee staff nurse Mary Skillett and departed at the conclusion of the series. Martin Ball joined the cast in episode fifteen as senior house officer Dave Masters and departed in episode twenty-four. Jane Gurnett made her debut in episode sixteen as staff nurse Rachel Longworth.

William Gaminara reprised his role as Andrew Bower in episodes nine and eleven, now appearing as Duffy's husband. Kristen departed the series in episode five and Webster departed at the conclusion of the series. Shipton, who had appeared on the show since its creation, chose to leave the show, stating "I just decided it was time to go." She departed in episode thirteen.

=== Main characters ===
- Martin Ball as Dave Masters (episodes 15−24)
- Ian Bleasdale as Josh Griffiths
- Doña Croll as Adele Beckford (episodes 1−24)
- Samantha Edmonds as Helen Chatsworth (episodes 2−10)
- Christopher Guard as Ken Hodges (episodes 1−7)
- Jane Gurnett as Rachel Longworth (from episode 16)
- Suzanna Hamilton as Karen Goodliffe (episodes 1−17)
- Anne Kristen as Norma Sullivan (until episode 6)
- Clive Mantle as Mike Barratt
- Tara Moran as Mary Skillett (episodes 12−24)
- Naoko Mori as Mie Nishi-Kawa (episodes 2−24)
- Steven O'Donnell as Frankie Drummer (episodes 2−24)
- Brendan O'Hea as Brian Crawford (episodes 9−19)
- Oliver Parker as Mark Calder (episodes 1−18)
- Patrick Robinson as Martin "Ash" Ashford
- Cathy Shipton as Lisa "Duffy" Duffin (until episode 13)
- Derek Thompson as Charlie Fairhead
- Caroline Webster as Jane Scott (until episode 24)

=== Recurring and guest characters ===
- William Gaminara as Andrew Bower (episodes 9 and 11)
- Brian Miller as Chris Sullivan (episodes 3 and 6)
- David Ryall as Tom Harley (episodes 10−13)
- Jo Unwin as Lucy Cooper (episodes 1, 15, 20−24)

== Episodes ==
No. overall	No. in series	Title	Directed by	Written by	Original release date	UK viewers (millions)
105	1	"Cat in Hell"	Charles Beeson	Ginnie Hole	18 September 1993	13.96
The A&E department has reopened after the fire, although many of the cubicles still have fresh unpainted plaster. Charlie goes over general manager Mark Calder's head to offer nurse Adele Beckford a move from part-time to full-time hours. Ash is wary of clinical nurse specialist Ken Hodges after applying unsuccessfully for his post. New SHO Karen Goodliffe makes an enemy of Josh when she accuses him and Jane of playing at being doctors. She helps a student who has suffered a severe reaction when participating in a drugs trial, and encourages him to pressure the drugs company for hush money. The team battle to treat victims of a train crash caused when a group of young boys steal a Cortina and, fleeing from police, allow it to stall on a level crossing. The car is pushed along the track and finally crushed at the mouth of a tunnel, while the train itself is derailed, part of it jack-knifing and causing deaths, appalling injuries and panic amongst trapped passengers. At one point a severed hand has to be scooped from the wreckage. Guest starring James Cosmo, Rowena Cooper, Tony Marshall and Ian Gelder. Note: Title Sequence (Blue hue) changed
106	2	"Riders on the Storm"	Matthew Evans	Susan Wilkins	25 September 1993	14.17
High winds hit the Holby area. Karen comes across a tree fallen on a car, killing the driver and injuring his wife (Adjoa Andoh). Josh and Jane are held up by the storm and the woman has died by the time they arrive. Duffy tells Karen not to have a temper tantrum when she criticises Josh and Jane for their late arrival. Vagrant Mungo (Paul Barber), a 'regular' at the A&E department, seeks shelter in the hospital. Gerry (Michael Feast), a driver who refused to stop and help, returns home and bullies his son Nicky before striking his wife Linda. Nicky stabs him in the neck with a fork. Linda refuses to leave her husband and Nicky is taken into care. Two thieves see a policeman hit by a billboard in the wind and one of them takes him to hospital. Two builders are repairing a roof for a customer (Kathleen Byron) when one is blown over the edge and his friend (Cliff Parisi) has to hold him to stop him falling; Josh saves the day by hiring a crane to get him down. The grateful friend tells Karen that Josh saved his mate's life; Karen begins to change her opinions of the paramedics. Ken tells Duffy he is gay. Norma is sent home from work after acting strangely and Mie Nishi-Kawa is drafted in as a replacement.
107	3	"The Final Word"	Matthew Evans	Peter Bowker	2 October 1993	14.48
A woman named Jackie (Joanna Riding) is brought in after being beaten up: Her parents (Barbara Ewing and David Burke) disapprove of her marriage since her husband Gary works on a fairground and she is now pregnant. It transpires her younger brother Kevin, eager for his parents' approval, beat her up and then sabotaged the ride for which Gary is responsible to get him into trouble: Three teenagers are badly injured as a result. Against his parents' wishes, Kevin confesses to Duffy and turns himself into the police. A woman (Brenda Bruce) parades her husband (Christopher Hancock), who is critically ill with lung disease, in front of the factory where he used to work, claiming he was exposed to asbestos there. He later dies and Mike chides Karen for innocently agreeing with his wife's suspicions. Jane enrols in an administrative course.
108	4	"No Place to Hide"	George Case	Scott Cherry	9 October 1993	15.12
An unconscious man is brought in from a car crash but when the staff contact the woman they believe is his wife, it turns out he merely had her husband's ID. She returns home to find her husband has been stabbed; when the police are called, they learn the two men fought over drug money. A woman (Michelle Fairley) who has been having an affair with her married boss (John Salthouse) takes two children out for a walk; one gets his arm stuck in a lift door and she falls down the lift shaft while trying to free him. She recovers but refuses to see her lover. An elderly man reacts badly to Mie and turns out to have been a Japanese prisoner of war. Norma is sent home after arguing with Mark. Duffy is concerned about Charlie spending time with Ken.
109	5	"Sunday, Bloody Sunday"	Richard Bramall	Andrew Holden	16 October 1993	15.31
A man (Terence Harvey) returns home to find his house has been burgled and his daughter attacked (Liza Walker). He takes her to the hospital where Karen discovers she has been raped. Another man (Craig Kelly) turns up with a cut leg. It turns out the pair set up the burglary together but he went too far in making it look convincing so she reports him. Two men arrange to sell firearms. One of them is killed in a car accident and is misidentified because the pair swapped coats. The survivor is arrested and his wife leaves him. Duffy is short with Charlie and Ken. Mark tells Charlie and Mike he intends to make Ken redundant in order to free up funds for a new manager. Norma tells Ash she is going to resign rather than apologise to Mark.
110	6	"Good Friends"	Laura Sims	Stephen Wyatt	23 October 1993	15.75
Norma's purse is stolen and she falls down some steps while chasing the thief. At the hospital, Duffy discovers her odd behaviour was down to her going through the menopause. An elderly man (Trevor Peacock) asks his two daughters (Julia Ford and Jayne Ashbourne) to help him die. They help him take some pills but then panic and call an ambulance. After being treated, he tells his son (Dorian Healy) that the pair tried to kill him but later admits the truth. A taxi driver is brought in after an accident and two wives turn up; he is a bigamist. Just as they are both deciding to leave him, a third wife turns up. Ash attends the birthday party of an old flatmate Dennis (Daniel Flynn). Dennis is high on amphetamines and turns on his girlfriend out of jealousy. Bouncer Leon (David Harewood), another friend of Ash, tries to step in and Dennis hits him with a bottle; Leon punches Dennis, causing him to hit his head on a metal pole and Dennis later dies in CRASH. Ken admits that he is in love with Charlie and doesn't think they should spend time together anymore; Charlie is upset about losing him as a friend. Mark offers Jane the role of A&E line manager.
111	7	"Kill or Cure"	Laura Sims	Greg Snow	30 October 1993	16.07
A girl who is worried about her divorced parents arguing has a severe asthma attack while doing gymnastics. Karen helps her tell her father she doesn't want to do gymnastics anymore. A stripper on his first day suffers burns when he bumps into a waiter during a routine at a restaurant and the oil on his body catches alight, meaning his wife finds out what his new job really is. A businessman who is being bullied by his girlfriend (Jaye Griffiths) goes on a parachute jump; he crashes into some trees and removes his harness, falling twenty feet. Despite breaking his neck and spine and being left paralysed, he breaks up with his girlfriend. Mark orders Mike and Charlie to tell Ken he no longer has a job. Ken makes his peace with Ash but leaves before Duffy can give him a bottle of whiskey as a farewell present.
112	8	"Born Losers"	George Case	(no writer credited)	6 November 1993	—
Two policemen investigate a house that has been burgled only to find that the elderly owner has rigged up an electric cable to trap the burglars, giving one of the policemen an electric shock. Ash is mugged by two youths on his way to work; the youths inject themselves with his insulin without knowing what it is. One of them (Kieran O'Brien) collapses during another robbery and is taken to hospital where Ash recognises him. He warns him his friend could be in danger but by the time the police find him he is dead. Mike learns a woman whose adopted daughter (Annette Badland) just moved to be nearer her birth mother has the foetus from her last miscarriage calcifying inside her. Despite warnings from Duffy and a specialist, she sees it as her child and refuses to have it removed. Helen is left in tears by the case and is comforted by Adele. Charlie is missing Ken and snaps at Duffy, Ash and Adele before admitting to Ash Ken was in love with him. Mark announces to the staff that Jane is their new manager; the staff feel betrayed, especially Charlie and Frankie, and Josh is upset at losing his partner.
113	9	"High Rollers"	Charles Beeson	Sam Snape	13 November 1993	15.90
A woman who has fallen out with her husband goes to the races with another man. A jealous woman (Andree Bernard) drives into the back of their van, killing the man she is with. When she learns she is pregnant, her husband refuses to believe the baby is his and tries to force her to have an abortion. A woman with a terminal brain tumour refuses to get back with her former husband. A girl walks in front of a lorry, causing the driver to swerve and hit the stationary car where her mother is sitting, killing her; she blames Mike for failing to save her. A man who collapsed at a card game carries on playing in his cubicle. Duffy and Andrew are trying for a baby. Charlie dismisses Jane's attempt to improve the department with a new rota.
114	10	"Deceptions"	Paul Harrison	Neil McKay	20 November 1993	—
A man (David Ross) with a good memory who has been winning money on quiz machines gets thrown through a window by a pub landlord after refusing to leave. Two women are brought in after getting into a fight on learning they were having an affair with the same man; after talking with Charlie, they tell their lover's wife what's been going on. Josh and Brian bring in a nervous woman (Frances White) who fell down some stairs; Karen learns she has breast cancer but has left it untreated. Tom Harley (David Ryall), the elderly locum consultant covering for Mike's holiday leave, convinces her to tell her boyfriend and have treatment. Car dealer Alan Mowbray sells a vehicle to Joe, one of his daughter Caroline's teachers; unknown to him, Joe and Caroline are having an affair. Joe later dies after crashing the car and Mowbray is arrested when the car is found to be stolen and unsafe. Duffy rushes off after hearing Andrew's sperm test results are back. Helen finishes her placement and Tom takes a photograph of her with Charlie and Adele as a memento.
115	11	"Give Us This Day"	Philip Casson	David Richard-Fox	27 November 1993	15.85
Mike Howlett is trying to close down a cult he used to be a member of and takes the father of one of the newest members, Emma (Helen Baxendale), to see how malnourished she is. Things go wrong when Emma's father tries to snatch her and she ends up being dragged along under their car. At the hospital, Tom convinces her to have treatment but when the group's leader, Abraham, reveals her friend Jennifer is a plant working for Mike she leaves with him. Charlie turns away a homeless woman (Louise Gold) wanting a bed for the night and she later comes back in beaten up. Ash treats an elderly vagrant whose foot has become fused with his sock through a lack of airing. A retired man deliberately eats nuts, which he is allergic to, to get attention from his wife. Duffy is pregnant and is planning to give up work but is unable to tell Charlie.
116	12	"Wild Card"	Richard Bramall	(no writer credited)	4 December 1993	16.32
A boy is brought in after falling off a swing and his mother (Melanie Hill) is eager to get him away. Tom and Ash learn they went for HIV tests after the boy's father died of AIDS but never collected the results. Tom tells the mother she is infected but her son is negative. A teacher suffers a nervous breakdown at work and the headmistress advises him to go to hospital. Karen and Adele discover old wounds and learn his wife (Amanda Root) is beating him. A mother brings in her large group of children who have diarrhoea. A businessman who collapsed in the street half-naked from a heart attack gropes new nurse Mary in a semi-conscious state; it turns out he was visiting a massage parlour and the masseuse brings his clothes in before his wife can see him. Jane regains some good will with the staff by helping out on reception. Duffy is still unable to tell Charlie she is leaving and resorts to leaving him a letter.
117	13	"The Good Life"	Diana Patrick	Susan Wilkins	11 December 1993	16.61
A man is found badly beaten at the docks. The staff discover he is a Bosnian Muslim and Frankie and Mike, who is visiting before returning to work, find him collapsed in the car park when he tries to flee. A group of travellers are on their way to Wales when an older member (Pete Postlethwaite) of the party collapses coughing. Karen learns he believes he has AIDS but Tom realises he actually has tuberculosis, which is treatable. Karen tells Tom she's learned a lot from him. Ash is upset when Duffy recommends Adele to take over from her instead of him. A couple find their baby a victim of cot death and the staff unsuccessfully try to resuscitate her. The father threatens to sue before breaking down. Duffy asks Charlie for a hug and they part on good terms.
118	14	"Out To Lunch"	Charles Beeson	Sam Snape	18 December 1993	16.06
A chef at an Italian restaurant goes into a rage on learning the manager has slept with his girlfriend and attacks him, only stopping when another cook hits him on the head with a bread board. He is convinced to return to work to cook for a guide critic but collapses. His girlfriend rushes to his side but Mary finds a photo showing he is married. A man is stung in the throat by a bee while hiking with his son; his son fetches an ambulance and Mike directs Josh to perform an emergency tracheotomy. A senile old man who cut his hand breaking a window is abandoned at the hospital by his daughter and son-in-law (Leslie Schofield), although they later return for him. Mark convinces Jane to help leak a story to the press claiming the hospital is being closed.
119	15	"Comfort and Joy" (Note: See also "Tidings of Comfort and Joy" series 24)	Richard Bramall	Barbara Machin	26 December 1993	17.03
A man dressed as an elf witnesses a house exploding. He needs treatment because his ears are stuck on and Charlie and Jane realise he is a thief. A fireman (Mark Williams) rescues the house's elderly occupant but she dies in hospital. The fireman later collapses from smoke inhalation; his wife (Annette Ekblom), who hasn't left the house in over a year, manages to visit him in hospital. A girl who has suddenly gone blind is brought in; she quickly regains her sight but turns out to have a brain tumour. Josh and Lucy nearly run over the new hospital chaplain (Mark Aiken). Charlie is missing Duffy, causing him to be bad-tempered, but softens when Frankie saves him from choking with the Heimlich manoeuvre.
120	16	"Family Ties"	John Darnell	Neil McKay	1 January 1994	14.92
Ash is promoted to charge nurse, while Charlie confronts Jane about the closure rumours; she claims the hospital is simply being downgraded. A woman (Sarah Badel) is visited by a debt collector who offers to clear the debt if she sleeps with him: She pushes him down some stairs then jumps into the docks. Josh rescues her and she berates her son for wasting their money. A mother brings her young son in, saying he isn't breathing; Mike realises she is hurting the child and gets her psychiatric help. A cricket match ends in chaos when an elderly bowler hits the batsman on the head with a ball and collapses. A woman who burnt her hair off is helped by Ash, Karen and new nurse Rachel, who help her get ready for a party with a wig. Karen falls asleep on duty because she is spending so much time studying so Mike gives her time off.
121	17	"United We Fall"	Richard Bramall	Andrew Holden	8 January 1994	—
Male and female (Rosie Marcel) teenage graffiti artists compete to place their tags in dangerous places. They both suffer accidents and end up in hospital; afterwards, they become a couple. A ballroom dancer (Amanda Noar) runs down a tramp on the way to a competition, badly injuring her leg, but drives off. After competing, her partner takes her to the hospital. A hit-and-run victim is brought in and she apologises to him but he isn't the man she ran down. Adele tells her the tramp was taken to Queens and was dead on arrival; she decides to make a statement. Mark tells the staff that the casualty department at Queens is closing.
122	18	"Tippers"	Philip Casson	Nick McCarty	15 January 1994	—
Dave joins the staff full time as Karen's replacement. A truck carrying toxic waste crashes and the driver and an attending policeman are both treated for contamination but a paper boy who was at the scene ignores his symptoms and dies. The company owner is reported to the police. Two soldiers return on leave from service in Northern Ireland: one of them, suffering from posttraumatic stress disorder, scares his wife, causing her to trip and fall out of a first floor window. Mark abandons the department to take up a job with a tobacco company; Ash realises he leaked the fake closure story so the staff would be too relieved about not being closed to complain about the extra work.
123	19	"Value for Money"	Diana Patrick	Allan Swift	22 January 1994	—
The staff worry about their jobs in the wake of the Queens closure. An elderly couple comes in after the man suffers a heart attack and he later recovers. Mike comforts his wife (Elizabeth Bradley). A man (Peter Guinness) with a painful leg believes his wife is having an affair with their son's football coach (Tim Dantay). His son (Andrew Lancel) tells him the coach is actually his boyfriend but the man refuses to believe him. He is told his arteries have been blocked because of smoking and his leg may need to be amputated. Ash tries to impress Mie by cooking an Oriental dish but only Frankie can bear to eat the result. A group of executives go on a team-building exercise but one collapses because of rheumatic fever. At the hospital, another (Kenneth Cope) collapses and dies from pancreatitis; both men lied about their health because they were worried about redundancies. The dead man's wife (Anne Stallybrass) and the female member of the group with whom he was having an affair blame his employer (Derek Fowlds) and attack him in the car park with a crook lock, leaving the staff to patch him up.
124	20	"Care in the Community"	Matthew Evans	Andrew Holden	29 January 1994	—
The staff worry about their jobs, since the department is merging with Queens and they all have to reapply. A mentally ill man is unable to get his medication from a chemist and slashes his own face with a knife before stabbing a pregnant woman who got in his way on the stairs. At the hospital, the woman's boyfriend attacks him and Charlie, Ash and Frankie intervene. The woman breaks up with her boyfriend and forgives her attacker. An elderly woman (Margery Mason) is knocked over by a shop security guard who is chasing a shoplifter. It turns out she is addicted to stealing gloves and returns some surgical gloves she stole from the hospital to Frankie. Mie tells Ash she isn't sure if she can move into his spare room because her family are worried she is getting too westernised. A Filipino woman escapes from a building through a window but when some workers try to talk to her she panics and walks into a parking meter. It turns out her employer (Anna Calder-Marshall) is treating her like a slave and physically abusing her; Mike and Rachel convince her to report the woman.
125	21	"Signed, Sealed, Delivered"	John Darnell	David Richard-Fox	5 February 1994	—
Two paramedics, Eric and Chris, try to pick up Joy, a girl who has overdosed on drugs but she panics and runs off. A deaf man is unhappy that his deaf sister is becoming dependent on sign language rather than learning to speak; while they are arguing, she steps in front of a van and suffers minor injuries. Josh and Lucy find Joy collapsed in the street and take her in. Eric and Chris go to pick up a pensioner who has collapsed in his house and Eric is bitten by a vicious dog in the process. The man is paranoid about burglars since his wife died after being confronted by one and is more worried about his house being left open than his condition. Joy claims a paramedic assaulted her and it is assumed she meant Josh until she makes it clear she was talking about Eric. Jane is unhappy with having to supervise cutbacks.
126	22	"Relations"	Philip Casson	Nick McCarty	12 February 1994	—
A taxi driver brings in a woman (Lorraine Ashbourne) who has been badly scalded by boiling fat. Adele discovers her boyfriend did it during an argument over having children. Her boyfriend turns up and is horrified to see her disfigured. Ash and Mie turn up late after an alarm clock didn't go off and worry everyone will assume they are a couple. Charlie and Mike abduct Jane to discuss the Queens plans. An Asian factory owner (Zia Mohyeddin) has arranged a marriage for his son but his son wants to marry one of the workers. When she is badly injured after getting her hair caught in a machine, he stands by her even though his father disinherits them. Josh and Lucy are called to a school where a boy who has been dubbed a troublemaker has attacked classmates with a baseball bat, being injured himself. Lucy feels he has been misjudged and asks Ash to talk to him. Ash learns he is being bullied because his father is a policeman and convinces him to tell the headmaster.
127	23	"Grand Rational"	Paul Harrison	Sam Snape	19 February 1994	—
Mary spends a shift with Eric and Chris in the ambulance, Eric having been cleared of the assault accusation. They pick up a woman injured in a football riot who tried to go to Queens, unaware of the closure; she dies en route, leaving Mary disillusioned. The riot spreads to the hospital and Mie is injured before Rachel restores order. Two teenage girls go skiing with one of the girls' mother (Georgina Allen). The other girl suffers a minor injury but is tired of her parents' (Julie Dawn Cole and Frederick Warder) overprotective attitude and decides to move in with her friend. A man (Robert Glenister) unhappy about his wife working as a masseuse stages a siege at her place of work. Lucy is taken hostage when she and Josh are called to attend. The man and his wife try to flee the scene in a car but they crash and the woman is killed. Charlie is pleased when he is granted funding for two more nurses until Jane tells him the decision has been reversed. Frankie arranges a snail race to raise money but Charlie leaves the hospital before he can collect his winnings.
128	24	"Hidden Agendas"	Matthew Evans	Andrew Holden	26 February 1994	—
A blind couple are about to get married but the woman, who has suffered from hysterical blindness since the age of six, falls down some stairs in shock after abruptly regaining her sight. Her fiancé (Paterson Joseph) is initially jealous until Ash talks him into speaking to her, to the relief of their parents (Rudolph Walker, Alibe Parsons and Colin McFarlane). An increased disillusioned Charlie turns up for work out of uniform on his 40th birthday, threatening to resign, and is further enraged to find a man with meningitis has been left in reception undiagnosed for hours. He tells Jane he likes her and she propositions him for after the shift. A suicidal man is distracted from shooting himself when his neighbour is attacked by drug dealers she owes money to and he is injured helping her. At the hospital, he gives her the money to clear her debt, then places a gun to his head in cubicles. Mary sees him and gets the department evacuated while Charlie goes in to talk to him and convinces him to hand over the gun.

== Bibliography ==
- Kingsley, Hilary (1995). Casualty: The Inside Story. Penguin Books. ISBN 0-14-024902-8.
