= Martin "Ash" Ashford (Casualty) =

Fictional character from the BBC medical drama Casualty

- Casualty character
- First appearance: "Penalty"; 7 September 1990
- Last appearance: "Solomon's Song"; 13 December 2014
- Portrayed by: Patrick Robinson
- Book appearances: One Day At A Time (1994)

In-universe information
- Full name: Martin Ashford
- Occupation: Consultant in emergency medicine; (prev. Charge nurse, senior staff nurse, staff nurse)
- Family: Franklyn Ashford (father)
- Spouse: Laura Milburn (1996−?; divorced)
- Significant other: Nikki Wyatt
- Children: Ella Ashford (daughter)

Martin "Ash" Ashford is a fictional character from the BBC medical drama Casualty, played by Patrick Robinson. He first appears in the series five episode "Penalty", originally broadcast on 7 September 1990. The character is introduced as a staff nurse at Holby City Hospital's emergency department (ED). Robinson was cast in 1990 and was surprised to receive a call for the role. Ash is characterised as a man of principle with high aspirations and a caring nature. He is well-respected in the department, where he also serves as the union representative. The character's early stories involve his relationship with student Nikki Wyatt (Imogen Boorman), which ends when she aborts their baby, and his promotions to senior staff nurse and charge nurse.

Through the character of Ash, the show explored racism, a story which Robinson disapproved of; he believed it was a predictable choice for a black character. In the narrative, Ash defends himself in an attack from a Neo-Nazi extremist, resulting in a suspension and being charged with assault. Robinson thought it did not match Ash's characterisation and clashed with scriptwriters over the plot. It concludes when Ash is acquitted at trial. The character's next story was lighter and lasted the course of series ten. Public relations officer Laura Milburn (Lizzy McInnerny) was introduced as a love interest for Ash, with their romance culminating in a wedding during the series finale. Through the story, Ash's father was also introduced.

Robinson decided to leave Casualty in 1995, having become disillusioned with the show. Ash and Laura depart together in the series 10 finale "Night Moves", originally broadcast on 24 February 1996. Robinson reprised the role for the two-part series 12 finale in 1998, with Ash acting as best man at Charlie Fairhead's (Derek Thompson) wedding. The character's reintroduction was announced in 2013, fifteen years since his last appearance; he returns in the series twenty-seven episode "If Not for You", originally broadcast on 9 February 2013. Ash becomes the department's new consultant, having retrained in America. His characterisation remained consistent to his original stint, with Ash retaining his nursing principals and diligent nature.

Ash's estranged teenage daughter, Ella Ashford (Tahirah Sharif), was introduced in 2013. Ella is rebellious and creates trouble for Ash, ending when Ash reports Ella to the police for stealing ketamine. Producers used the characters of Ash and junior doctor Lily Chao (Crystal Yu) to explore workplace bullying. When Ash lies to Lily about a patient dying, she takes him to a tribunal and wins. The character was written out of the show off-screen in 2015, making his final appearance in the series 29 episode "Solomon's Song", originally broadcast on 13 December 2014. His exit was criticised by fans, the press and Robinson himself. The character received a positive reception from television critics, with a reporter from The Telegraph including Ash in the show's ten best characters.

== Casting ==
Robinson was cast in the role of nurse Martin "Ash" Ashford in 1990 after touring Africa with the Royal Shakespeare Company. He did not expect to be employed after returning from the tour and was surprised to receive a call about the role of Ash. Casualty marks Robinson's first television role. For the role, Robinson commutes between his London home and the show's studio in Bristol. Despite his role as a nurse, the actor dislikes hospitals and avoids them wherever possible. This dislike stems from a negative experience after a hockey injury.

== Development ==
=== Characterisation ===
Doctor by trade, Ash is a nurse at heart and as such isn’t afraid to go to anyone who he thinks might help in a given situation, which gains him much respect. Ash is no pushover – he has strong opinions and is happy to say the things no one else will say. He’s also a pragmatist and a long-termist – able to see the bigger picture and stay calm in a crisis.

— An excerpt from Ash's profile on the official Casualty website.

Ash is characterised as a man of principle who has aspirations for himself. As a nurse, he is eager and follows the rules. Hilary Kingsley, the author of Casualty: The Inside Story, described Ash as "an angel", "sensitive" and "ever-capable". The character is billed as "a loving and caring person". He is well-respected by his colleagues. Ash is the department's union representative. The character's biography states that he lives in a small, mortgaged studio flat and that he has a "headstrong" sister who clashes with their mother. He is also a diabetic. Scriptwriter Peter Bowker felt that Ash is a character that viewers could relate to.

Introduced as a staff nurse, Ash was promoted to senior staff nurse in series 7. A story in the following series sees Ash unsuccessfully interview for a promotion to clinical nurse specialist. Ken Hodges (Christopher Guard) was given the position, which "niggled" Ash as his friend Charlie Fairhead (Derek Thompson) was on the decision panel. Later in the series, he received a promotion to charge nurse, following the exit of Sister Lisa "Duffy" Duffin (Cathy Shipton).

As a doctor, Ash takes a "hands-on" role and prefers helping patients rather than administration side of his role. Robinson explained that Ash feels that admin "hinder[s] rather than help[s] people". Although he has become a doctor, Ash maintains his nursing principals and will seek any necessary help when required, something which others respect. Robinson opined that Ash is the same person from his initial stint, just in a different job. He commented, "He was conscientious, did the job well and cared, and that bottom line is still there, but now he’s a doctor he’s more knowledgeable." Ash is unafraid to share his opinions and will not be a "pushover". Proving useful for his work environment, he can stay calm and is able to understand the wider issues. Robinson enjoyed portraying Ash and found him "interesting to play".

=== Early relationships ===
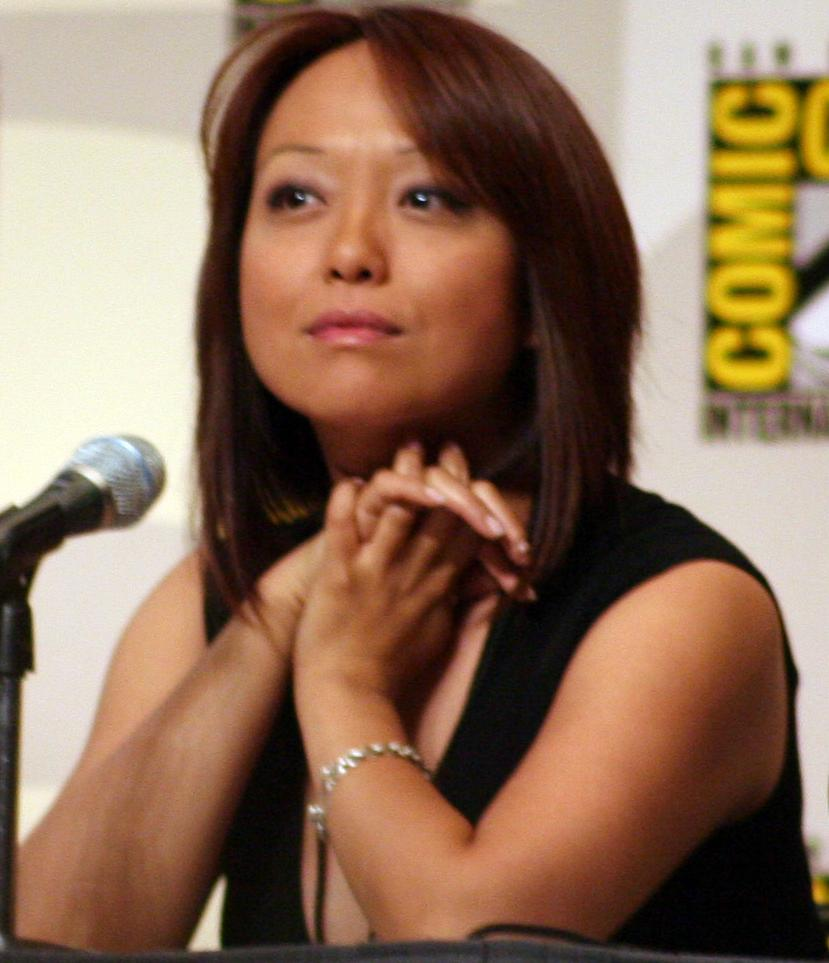
Ash develops a friendship with Mie Nishi-Kawa (Naoko Mori, pictured).

At the beginning of series 7, it is established that Ash is in a relationship with student Nikki Wyatt (Imogen Boorman). Robinson explained that Ash "really liked" Nikki. Producers created problems for the couple and split up briefly. After being reunited, Nikki discovers she is pregnant but struggles with this and decides to have an abortion. This results in the end of their relationship. Reflecting on his character's romantic life, Robinson thought Ash had to "suppress his feelings" and focus on his work.

Naoko Mori joined the cast as receptionist Mie Nishi-Kawa in series 8. Writers developed a friendship between Ash and Mie across the series. Towards the end of the series, Mie decides to leave Holby. An Inside Soap columnist noted it was "make or break time for their blossoming friendship". Robinson opined that his character did not have good luck with women, highlighted by the lack of developments in his friendship with Mie.

In February 1994, the show released the fictional book, One Day at a Time, focusing on the character of Ash. Robinson also released an audiobook version of the story on cassette tape. The story explores how Ash manages to cope with his professional and romantic life. Robinson enjoyed exploring the character's "complicated" personal life.

=== Racist attack ===
Writers took the character of Ash on a "journey of self-discovery" during the ninth series. Kingsley noted that although Ash began the series happy in his new role with added administration responsibility, this changed after he is involved in a racist attack. When a group of Neo-Nazi extremists are admitted, they verbally assault Ash and Eddie Gordon (Joan Oliver). After Ash retaliates, he is threatened, which is overheard by receptionist Matt Hawley (Jason Merrells). Charlie sends Ash home, but as he leaves, the gang's leader Hitchens (Daniel Ryan) pulls a knife on him. Ash punches him in self-defence. Robinson explained that Ash is "under huge amounts of pressure" and is annoyed with that Eddie has been "manhandled". The actor sympathised with his character, noting how Ash has to deal with racism on a regular basis. He pointed out that Ash normally ignores the racism he receives but on this occasion, "he just snapped".

Robinson strongly disapproved of the story and clashed with scriptwriters over it, as he did not believe it was in-character for Ash. He labelled the story "pathetic" and opined that he was "hurt" over newer characters receiving better stories. Having personally experienced racism on a regular basis, Robinson did not feel Ash would respond to racism like this and believed he would actually have more "self-control and cool-headedness". Another reason he disagreed with the story was he thought it was too "obvious" for a black man to be involved in a racism plot and opined that there was more interesting stories that could be explored. The actor suffered anxiety over the story, so spoke extensively with the scriptwriters, allowing him to understand the "logic" behind the decision.

In an interview with Evening Standard's Jim Thorpe, Robinson observed that "racism, in one form or another, is everywhere", including on the Casualty set. On the story, he commented, "There is a certain irony to the storyline that I hope will not be lost on people." The incident took place outside the department, a point of contention for Robinson and scriptwriters. Originally, writers located the fight inside the department but Robinson thought it did not match his professional characterisation. The actor used his own experiences of racism to understand what Ash's limit would be. Robinson viewed the decision to have the incident outside the ED as a "comprise".

Despite protests from Charlie and consultant Mike Barratt (Clive Mantle), hospital bosses suspend Ash from his job. Police arrest Ash on an actual bodily harm (ABH) charge and seek out any witnesses in the hospital staff. Robinson explained that Ash's colleagues want to help him, but nobody actually saw the attack. The actor pointed out that Ash is understanding of this fact. He told a Inside Soap columnist that Ash does not "expect people to lie to the police for him".

Other characters were incorporated into the story through the trial. Eddie struggles with the trial as she wants to support Ash, but did not see the weapon. Ahead of the trial, Ash becomes "worried" and asks Charlie and Mike to be character witnesses. Matt withholds the "critical evidence" that Ash was threatened by the gang. Hitchens begins threatening Matt to prevent him from testifying in court. Nurse Jude Korcanik (Lisa Coleman) criticises Matt and when he witnesses another incident of domestic violence at home, he agrees to testify in court. Ash is acquitted at the trail and returns to the work.

At the conclusion of the story, Robinson took a short break from the series. In the narrative, Ash begins to feel uneasy following his return and decides to take a lecturing job at the local nursing college. Robinson told Thorpe that he was considering his future on the drama following rumours about Casualty airing two thirty-minute episodes a week. He disliked the idea of changing format and felt it would prevent stories from being developed properly. The character returns at the start of series 10.

=== Relationship with Laura Milburn ===
In January 1995, Robinson told a reporter from Inside Soap that he wanted his character to be given a new love interest. He thought Ash would be better suited to an older, experienced woman rather than a "young whipper-snapper". The actor spoke to show bosses about wanting Ash to be involved in a happy relationship with a black woman. He suggested the characters to meet through work and thought it could create opportunities for black actresses. He highlighted that black actors rarely interact onscreen and this could help that issue. Robinson told Caroline Sutton of the Sunday Mirror that he regularly informed scriptwriters about how his character would talk, which sometimes created arguments. He commented, "I've had to fight for my corner as the only minority on the creative side".

Producers did not agree with Robinson's idea for a black love interest and instead cast white actress Lizzy McInnerny in the role of "posh and pretty" public relations officer Laura Milburn. Robinson felt it was an appropriate time for Ash to be involved in another relationship. He relished the opportunity to portray Ash's emotional side, opining that he had not showcased this side of Ash before. Ash and Laura stem from different backgrounds. However, their similarities lie in how they are "both ambitious and care passionately about their work", according to Robinson.

Writers wanted to look at how Ash deals with another partner following Mie's departure. Robinson pointed out that Ash had "scars" and was "devastated when his last girlfriend left him". He told Richard Arnold from Inside Soap that Ash has become a "lonely man" and felt it would be "fulfilling" for him to have a partner. Laura spends a day in the ED and receives a hostile reception from the team, except Ash, who she bonds with. Arnold's colleague noted that they appear "to be getting on like a house on fire". Ash and Laura spend the night together, but he is hesitant to commit to the relationship and tells Charlie it was just a one-night stand. This creates a "frosty climate" between the pair at work.

Robinson thought the pair could form a relationship as they "really fancy each other!" Likewise, the story team wanted Ash to have a serious relationship and avoided turning it into a "whirlwind romance". Robinson and McInnerny became good friends off-screen, which supported their on-screen relationship and any intimate scenes. For one scene, the pair were required to kiss for a minute. However, having not heard the director end the scene, they continued for twenty minutes. Robinson found the experience amusing, whilst McInnerny admitted that she becomes "too serious over scenes like that", which created the delay.

The relationship develops when Ash proposes to Laura, but is challenged through the introduction of Ash's father, Franklyn Ashford (Oscar James). Ash receives abuse from his father for his decision to marry a white woman. Robinson had suggested introducing the character's father, but had to lead rewrites for the stories due to "subtle racism" in the original scripts. Writers created a "white wedding" for the couple, which was the focus of the season 10 finale. The wedding was filmed in Redland Chapel in Bristol, England, near the show's filming studios. Filming took place on a cold day and to stay warm, McInnerny had a heater underneath her wedding dress. Two local schoolchildren were cast as Laura's bridesmaids. Robinson thought such a wedding was "far too much hassle" and did not think it would suit him.

=== Departure (1996) and return ===
In July 1995, Robinson told Anton Antonowicz from the Daily Mirror that he did not want to remain with the series forever and would leave in the near future. He expressed an interest in pursuing new acting opportunities and thought he could use his Casualty fame to further his career. Both Robinson and McInnerny decided to leave the show at the conclusion of series 10. The show's producer understood Robinson's decision to leave the series. The actor was cast in leading roles for two new television dramas, prompting his decision. He admitted to being disillusioned with the show, explaining that it lacked its "family atmosphere" and had too high a turnover of cast. He commented, "I want to bury the ghost of Ash and get on with the rest of my career." McInnerny decided to leave as she was unhappy with the lack of sole focus on her character.

Robinson filmed his final scenes in January 1996 and the character was written out in the series 10 finale, departing together after their wedding. John Thompson of the Evening Post expected the episode to be viewed by 20 million viewers. Reflecting on his time on the show, Robinson said it was "a huge learning experience", which helped him to support his family and become known in the acting industry. He admitted that following his departure, he struggled to secure other roles as directors associated him with the character of Ash too much.

It was confirmed in February 1998 that Robinson would return for the two-part series 12 finale. He returns alongside former cast members Shipton (Duffy), Mantle (Clive) and Brenda Fricker (Megan Roach), who all signed a £10,000 contract to appear in the finale. A Daily Record columnist reported that producers believed they had "pulled off a coup" by securing the four returns as part of "nail-biter" finale. Ash returns to act as the best man at Charlie's wedding to Baz Wilder (Julia Watson), but is thrown into helping the team when an accident occurs. When he returns, Ash reveals that he and Laura are divorcing. Robinson revealed in a 2012 interview with the Sunday Mercury that he had previously been approached to reprise the role again, but he could not due to prior commitments with the Royal Shakespeare Company.

=== Reintroduction ===
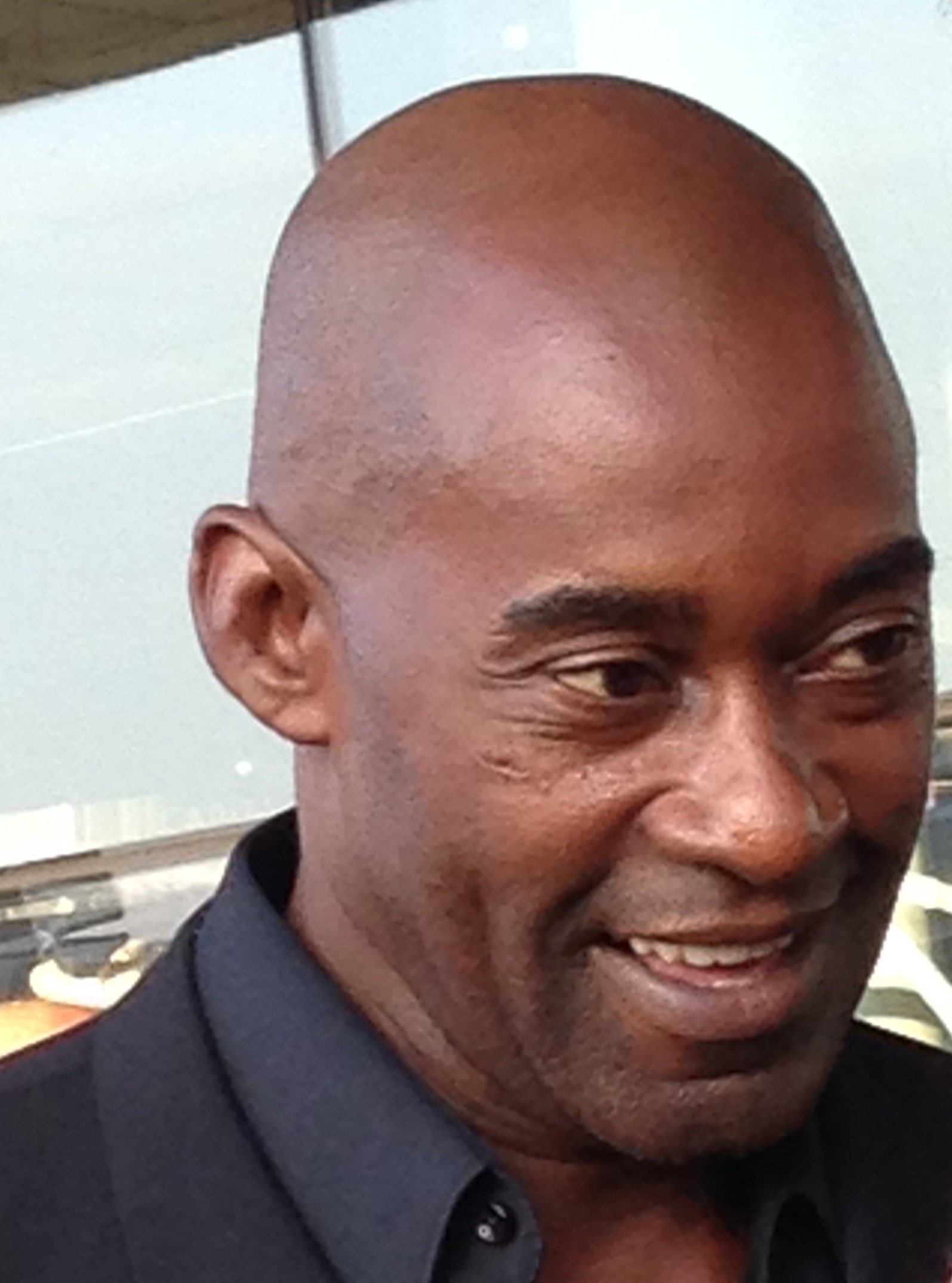
Patrick Robinson (pictured) reprised his role as Ash in 2013.

On 3 February 2013, it was announced that Robinson had reprised his role as Ash, fifteen years after his last appearance. Ash returns as the department's new consultant, having retrained in his time away. The decision to reintroduce the character followed actor Michael French's decision to leave his role as Nick Jordan, opening up a space for a new character. Johnathan Young, the show's executive producer, expressed his joy at Robinson's return and deemed him "a hugely popular character". On his return, Robinson commented, "Recreating a character that has moved on and changed so much is incredibly challenging and this feels like a totally new job."

Since his departure, Ash underwent training to become a doctor in America. Robinson thought that it made sense for Ash to retrain as a doctor, based on his previous career progression as a nurse. In America, Ash spent time working in The Bronx, where he specialised in emergency medicine. Robinson explained that Ash was able to gain valuable experience of "dealing with gunshot wounds and stabbings" due to location.

Ash returns in the series twenty-seven episode "If Not for You", originally broadcast on 9 February 2013. After being informed of the vacancy by Charlie, Ash takes a locum position in the ED. Robinson told Elaine Reilly of What's on TV that Ash and Charlie have kept contact since he left, mirroring his own relationship with Thompson. Young felt that Ash and Charlie's reunion would "reignite a friendship that we hope will delight viewers old and new". Robinson was pleased to be working with Thompson again, likening it to returning home. He teased that Ash could take on a permanent position. While travelling to his first shift, he attends a motorbike accident and assist the paramedics. Arriving late for his shift, he is then left in charge of the ED when clinical lead Zoe Hanna (Sunetra Sarker) becomes unwell. Young thought that Ash would provide "a unique perspective to the ED".

=== Friendships ===
The show's story team developed mainly positive relationships between Ash and other characters following his reintroduction. However, writers did opt to create some conflict for the character through a fractious relationship with Zoe. Robinson thought that Ash's manner and avoidance of admin made the atmosphere "chilly" between the pair. In one scenario, Ash and Zoe clash professionally after offering a patient's relative differing prognosis. Zoe is "furious" to discover that Ash has provided the relative with "false hope" and then delivers further treatment.

In late 2014, writers developed a friendship between Ash and nurse Rita Freeman (Chloe Howman). When Rita is exposed for lying about her dead husband, she reaches "rock bottom" and uses alcohol to "numb her shame and pain". Jonathan Phillips, a show producer, told a Penarth Times reporter that the characters would be involved in a "dramatic, turbulent and exciting" story. Rita's alcohol use begins to impact her work as she makes mistakes and arrives late. Ash then catches Rita drinking vodka in the staffroom. She does not arrive for her next shift, afraid she will be sacked. Ash becomes "concerned" and visits her home, where he finds Rita struggling among multiple empty bottles. Howman noted that Ash provides Rita with the support she needs to "get a grip and sort herself out". The show filmed the scenes on-location in a house in Penarth across one day. They used the house as a double for Rita's flat.

=== Introduction of daughter ===
"Ash wasn't around when Ella was growing up. In his mind his only child is perfect – she can do no wrong. Ultimately he doesn't know her at all, and that's why he's blinkered to seeing Ella in her true light!"

—Robinson on how Ash initially sees his daughter.

Producers introduced Ash and Laura's teenage daughter, Ella Ashford (Tahirah Sharif), in May 2013. The character had previously been referenced in the show as Ash returned to Holby to be closer to Ella, having become estranged. Ella is described as "rebellious" and "beloved" by Ash, who she has "wrapped around her little finger". Ella has grown up in Laura's care with little contact from Ash, meaning that he does not know his daughter well. This has also created trust issues with men for Ella. Robinson explained that Ash views Ella as his "perfect" daughter who "can do no wrong". Consequently, Ash develops a "blinkered" view of Ella.

Ella first appears when she is admitted to ED following a car accident. It quickly transpires that Ella is drunk, despite being underage. Ella claims that her drink was spiked, which Ash believes. He then instructs his colleagues to provide special treatment for Ella. Writers created more trouble with Ella over several months. In one scenario, Ella has a fling with her schoolteacher. This leads Ash to arrange for Ella to move in with him.

The story concludes when Ash reports Ella to the police. The incident begins as Ella invites friends to Ash's house to take ketamine, which she has stolen from Ash's medical supply. This prompts Ash to see Ella's true colours. Robinson noted that Ash now understands that Ella is "a hardnosed, streetwise kid". Ash decides to report Ella to the police so that she can understand the true error of her ways. Robinson told Elaine Reilly from What to Watch that his character decides that Ella needs to "learn the hard way" in order to change and gives her "a really sharp, serious shock". He added that Ella's behaviour has started to impact Ash, his work and his colleagues, which has made him realise that Ella is "a liability". Robinson also stressed the importance of Ash following through on his decision as he did not want Ella becoming "the mainstay of how people think about him".

=== Bullying Lily Chao ===
In 2013, producers introduced a new F2 doctor - Lily Chao (Crystal Yu) - to be mentored by Ash. At the end of her first shift, Ash has to reprimand Lily for her abrasive bedside manner. On one shift, Ash joins the paramedics on a "dramatic water rescue" and invites Lily to accompany him for the experience. They are called out to the old city docks, where two boys have gone tombstoning and one has been left trapped underwater. Ash works with paramedic Jeff Collier (Matt Bardock) to save the boy and they both jump into the "ice-cold dock with no thought for their own safety". Ash is successful in freeing the trapped boy from the underwater debris and resuscitates him on land, watched by Lily who is amazed by Ash's work. Back in the ED, Lily praises Ash for his work at the dock but he is furious that a junior doctor would appraise him and verbally abuses her. A show press officer commented, "Lily has a lot to learn about the realities of working in an ED!" They told Sarah Ellis of Inside Soap that Ash is appalled to have to justify his decisions to Lily, who is "mortified to be given such a public dressing-down".

Ash continues to mentor Lily but becomes concerned by her abrasive attitude. When she ignores his instructions about a patient's care, Ash lies to Lily that her patient has died, hoping to "teach her a lesson". Lily accuses Ash of bullying her and files a formal complaint. This results in a tribunal led by Guy Self (John Michie), the hospital's chief executive officer. Michie reprised his role from spin-off series Holby City for the episode. At the hearing, Ash struggles to justify his actions and cannot be defended by Charlie. Elaine Reilly from What to Watch pointed out that Ash "expresses genuine remorse for the heartache he caused his junior doctor". Ash is given a formal written warning at the conclusion of the tribunal. Lily then makes a request to continue working at the ED, which to his colleague's surprise, Ash supports.

=== Departure (2014) ===
Robinson was written out of the show in 2014, making his last appearance in the series 29 episode "Solomon's Song", originally broadcast on 13 December 2014. His departure was not announced prior to broadcast and Ash was given an off-screen exit. Robinson was informed of the producers' decision not to renew his contract in December 2013; the contract ended in summer 2014. The actor told Tess Lamacraft from What's on TV that he was "absolutely gutted" to leave the show. He was disappointed that his character did not receive an official exit, noting, "one minute he was there and the next he wasn't".

The character's off-screen departure received criticism from fans, who deemed it "low-key". In response, producer Erika Hossington explained that character exits varied based on other storylines in the show as sometimes, it does not feel appropriate to portray big exit stories alongside other prominent stories. Hossington recognised that Ash's departure "may have felt underpowered in the moment", but wanted to use his exit to develop other stories. She pointed out that if Ash remained in the show, Lily would not have bullied her mentee, Alicia Munroe (Chelsea Halfpenny).

== Reception ==
"Standing strong and silent on the wards of Holby General, Charge Nurse Martin Ashford copes with the dramas of day-to-day hospital life like a true pro! But when it comes to affairs of the heart, he's something of an accident victim."

—Inside Soap journalist Richard Arnold on the character of Ash.

A reporter of The Telegraph included Ash in the ten best characters of Casualty. They called him "dependable, capable and keen" and thought he was an obvious choice for Charlie's best man. On his change in occupation, they wrote, "Ash might now be a doctor by trade [...] but he is a nurse at heart." Anna Day from The Mirror called Ash a "kindly nurse", while Marion McMullen of the Coventry Evening Telegraph described him as a "caring nurse".

An Inside Soap journalist labelled Ash "hapless" and a "heart throb". Fraser Massey from the Western Daily Press called the character and Robinson a "popular" part of the series. He felt that the show could suffer if he was to quit. A Rossendale Free Press reporter dubbed the character a "hard-pressed charge nurse". A columnist from Bracknell and Ascot Times called Ash a "long-suffering Casualty regular". Thompson (Evening Post) called Ash's first departure "a romantic climax" to the series.

Robinson received a positive response on the impact of his character. He explained that Ash became "a positive role model for young black kids". The actor also gained positive feedback from nurses, who related to his portrayal of the professional. In a 2008 interview, Robinson acknowledged that Ash is his most notable role, admitting that he was still stopped in public and called Ash. On his feelings towards this, the actor commented, "I don't mind. I've got a lot of love for the character."

Sophie Dainty of Digital Spy was surprised by Ash's sudden departure in 2014, dubbing it "a rather bizarre turn of events". In a March 2019 feature for the publication, Dainty expressed an interest in Ash returning. She noted that he had a "pretty pivotal role in the department" and "a rich history with the show". She also respected his "calm and pragmatic" characterisation.

== Bibliography ==
- Silver, Rachel (1998). Casualty: Behind The Scenes. BBC Worldwide. ISBN 0-563-38467-0.
- Kingsley, Hilary (1995). Casualty: The Inside Story. Penguin Books. ISBN 0-14-024902-8.
