= Last Rights (TV series) =

- Genre: Political thriller
- Written by: Clive Bradley
- Directed by: Bill Anderson
- Starring: Philip Glenister; Charles Dance; Ashley Walters; Kiera Malik; Sonnell Dadral; Iddo Goldberg; Stephen Graham; Colin McFarlane; Mamta Kaash
- Composer: Nick Bicât
- Country of origin: United Kingdom
- Original language: English
- No. of series: 1
- No. of episodes: 3

Production
- Executive producer: Rob Pursey
- Producer: Philip Trethowan
- Cinematography: Kieran McGuigan
- Editor: Paul Knight
- Running time: 60 minutes
- Production company: Touchpaper Television

Original release
- Network: Channel 4
- Release: 24 March 2005

Last Rights is a British television political thriller drama, written by Clive Bradley and directed by Bill Anderson, which first aired on Channel 4. Despite the subject matter, all three episodes were broadcast back-to-back from 9 am on 24 March 2005, as part of a strand of programming aired towards the run-up to the 2005 UK General Election.

The series stars Philip Glenister as John Speers, a spin-doctor and right-hand man to the newly elected prime minister, Richard Wheeler (Charles Dance), who tries to prevent the leak of potentially sensitive confidential information when his laptop is stolen by a young tearaway. The series also co-starred Ashley Walters, Iddo Goldberg, Stephen Graham and Colin McFarlane. Aside from a single rerun during the T4 strand of programming in 2006, the series has never been repeated since and has never been released on DVD. Due to the timeslot of broadcast, no viewing figures were recorded for any of the three episodes.

== Plot ==
London, 2009. Voter apathy is at an all-time high in the United Kingdom, and a new right-wing political party, The Democratic Consensus Party, led by Richard Wheeler, have just been voted into office. Unbeknownst to the public, the DCP have a sinister hidden agenda to do away with democracy and turn the country into a police state. John Speers panics when just days after being appointed as Wheeler's right-hand-man and spin-doctor, his laptop is stolen by Tariq, a young tearaway. Concerned that the laptop contains potentially sensitive and confidential information, Speers sets about trying to recover it. Meanwhile, Tariq's best friend, Max is concerned when he suddenly disappears without trace. Max finds himself unwittingly drawn into a dangerous world of corruption and political conspiracy as he goes in search of his missing friend. Max subsequently discovers information which threatens to ruin the government's plans, but will he realise its significance in time?

== Cast ==
- Philip Glenister as Speers
- Charles Dance as Wheeler
- Ashley Walters as Max
- Kiera Malik as Melissa
- Sonnell Dadral as Tariq
- Iddo Goldberg as Sol
- Stephen Graham as Steve
- Colin McFarlane as Don
- Mamta Kaash as Shahida
- Raquel Cassidy as Nadine
- Francesca Fowler as Liz
- Niall Refoy as Brown
- Paul Rattray as Pete
- Martin Walsh as Dermot
- Anthony Oseyemi as Jameel
- Olivia Scott as Zara
- Jaimi Barbakoff as Sheryl
- Jon Snow as Himself
