= Death of Liu Fan =

Chinese nurse

Liu Fan (Chinese: 柳帆; October 1960 – 14 February 2020) was a Chinese deputy chief nurse of Wuchang Hospital in Wuhan, Hubei. She was the first nurse to die from SARS-CoV-2 infection, at the age of 59.

Her death caused strong internet reactions across China. Both her parents and her brother died of the coronavirus before her, which led many to characterise their deaths as "family extinction" (灭门). Many saw her work conditions during the outbreak as unacceptable. Initially, the news of her death was declared a "fabricated rumour”. Separately, the death of her brother, Chang Kai, a renowned director, had received strong internet reactions and wide commemorations. The initial hospital responses to her death drew heavy criticism, forcing both the hospital and Wuhan government to issue special responses to address and explain circumstances around her death.

== Life ==
In 2016, Liu was rehired by the outpatient injection room of Wuchang Hospital after reaching retirement age. In 2017, because of the cancellation of the outpatient injection room, she was assigned to the Liyuan Street Community Health Service Center under the hospital as an injection room nurse. Liu remained on duty before 2 February 2020. She was diagnosed with COVID-19 in the west hospital district of Wuchang Hospital on 7 February and was admitted to the hospital for treatment the same day. On 12 February, Liu was transferred to the intensive care unit of the east hospital district of Wuchang Hospital. With relatively many underlying conditions, her condition progressively worsened. She died at 18:30 on February 14, 2020 at the age of 59.

Wuchang Hospital expressed its condolences for her death. Liu's younger brother, Chang Kai, was the director of the External Liaison Department of Hubei Film Studio. Prior to Liu Fan's death, both of her parents and her brother also died of the coronavirus. Her husband and daughter were being isolated without signs of the infection.

== Controversies after death ==
News of her death initially circulated rapidly on the Internet, as allegedly she had no access to basic protection gear while treating patients of the highly infectious COVID-19, and both her parents had died from the virus. Her death also received considerable attention as she was the first nurse to die from COVID-19, she remained on duty through the Chinese New Year Week, and she died on Valentine's Day with her parents dead from the virus and her only brother in ICU. This was later declared as "fabricated rumour" by official censors, who said none of the claims were true and denounced those posting the news as "directed by foreign powers".

The details were later in turn confirmed as true. These provoked greater reactions when she and the renowned director Chang Kai were linked as siblings. His earlier news of death had drawn general attention and strong reactions, as all four people in his family were reportedly dead from the same infection due to a lack of beds, leaving only his son who was spared because he was studying in the UK, and as his strongly and earnestly worded will addressing his circumstances was posted by his friends.

Another controversy arose surrounding her death when her hospital was accused of dehumanising her, of belittling the profession, and of implicitly blaming her for her death. Phrases by the hospital in an interview such as "she was merely a nurse doing injections", "the hospital did not place her in a front-line job", and "the hospital strictly requires all personnels to take good personal protections" drew heavy criticism. The Wuhan city government was forced to issue a public statement in response to address her circumstances.

== See also ==
- List of deaths due to COVID-19
