= Odin's People =

Irish folk music group

Odin's People were an Irish folk trio active in the 1960s, made up of twins Elaine and Derek Thompson and Larry Johns They released two singles on the Major Minor label in 1967.
