= Helen Greaves =

British TV producer and writer

- Born: Winscombe, Somerset, England
- Occupations: Television Script editor, producer, writer

Helen Greaves is an English television script editor, producer and writer. She was born in Winscombe Somerset and grew up near Wigton in Cumbria and in Oxfordshire.

Greaves studied Drama at Manchester University and she later went on to work at Contact Theatre and then the BBC in London.

Greaves began as working as a Floor Assistant at BBC TV centre on various shows including Top of the Pops, Saturday Superstore and later as a script editor in BBC Drama where she worked with writers including Penelope Mortimer, John Mortimer, John Harvey, Peter Flannery, Ian La Frenais, Jimmy Nail and Sandy Welch on the series Casualty, Summer’s Lease, Portrait of a Marriage, A Fatal Inversion and Spender. She later worked as a producer on EastEnders, O Mary This London and Life With Eliza. She also wrote for Casualty, Bramwell and Holby City.

In 2009 she wrote and co-produced the short film "Perfect Day" and in 2012 she wrote Walking the Dogs which starred Emma Thompson and Eddie Marsan.

She is currently working as a screenwriter on film projects. She lives in North London.

== Filmography ==
=== Writer ===
- Casualty (1992)
- Bramwell (1996-1997)
- Holby City (2002)
- 10 Minute Tales (2009)
- Playhouse Presents 'Walking The Dogs' with Emma Thompson and Eddie Marsan (2012)

=== Producer ===
- EastEnders (1992)
- Screen Two (1994)
- 10 Minute Tales (2009)

Media offices
Preceded by Leonard Lewis	Executive Producer of EastEnders; 1991–92	Succeeded by Barbara Emile
