= Imogen Boorman =

British actress

- Born: Imogen May Pratt Boorman; 13 May 1971 (age 55); Pembury, Kent, England
- Occupations: film and television actress (formerly)
- Years active: 1984–1993

Imogen May Pratt Boorman (born 13 May 1971) is an English former film and television actress. She is known for portraying Tiffany in the horror film Hellbound: Hellraiser II, Lorina in Dreamchild, Clothilde in May to December and Hannah Preston in Westbeach.

Educated at Benenden School in Kent, Boorman went on to attend the Kent Institute of Art & Design to study for a BTEC Foundation Diploma in General Art and Design.

== Filmography ==
Film and television
Year	Film	Role	Notes
1982	Frost in May	Nanda (as child)	"Frost in May"
1984	The Tripods	Fiona Vichot	"France: September, 2089 AD"
1985	Dreamchild	Lorina	
1988	Hellbound: Hellraiser II	Tiffany	
1990	Theatre Night	Iphigenia	"Iphigenia at Aulis"
1990	The Ruth Rendell Mysteries	Veronica Williams	"An Unkindness of Ravens: Parts 1 & 2"
1991	Lovejoy	Melissa Harrington-Morse	"Sugar & Spice"
1991	Screen One	Hayley Forbes-Clinton	"Alive and Kicking"
1992	The Good Guys	Jenny Toth	"Horseplay"
1992	May to December	Clothilde	"Just Like a Woman"
1992	Coronation Street	Vanessa Morgan	Recurring role
1992	Get Back	Michelle	"You Never Give Me Your Money"
1992–93	Casualty	Nikki Wyatt	Recurring role (series 7)
1993	Westbeach	Hannah Preston	Main role

== Legal issues ==
Boorman was arrested in 2006 and appeared in court to admit struggling with ambulance staff at Raigmore Hospital in Inverness. An ambulance had been called to her home at Kindeace by her boyfriend after she accidentally cut herself with a wine glass; however, she shouted and swore at police and medical staff who were trying to help her. Following another incident in November 2007, she was given probation and community service for resisting arrest and struggling with police at her home.

In August 2009, Boorman was arrested after she was found drunk in rainy conditions with a three-year-old girl who was dressed as a fairy. She pleaded guilty to "being in charge of a child and willfully exposing the child in a manner likely to cause unnecessary suffering or injury while she was intoxicated with alcohol or drugs", and was given two years' probation and ordered to complete 120 hours of community service. Boorman's solicitor said that she "had a history of alcohol problems".

In June 2016, Boorman was arrested after pulling into a filling station with two children in the back of her camper van. Staff became aware that she was intoxicated and removed her keys from the van. She later admitted to a drink-driving charge, banned from driving for two years and issued a fine.

On 1 May 2023, Boorman was arrested at The Picture House Pub in Montrose. Boorman stole and consumed whiskey, striking a customer multiple times when he tried to intervene. She then removed all of her clothing, performing lewd acts with a whiskey bottle before lying on the bar and drinking straight from the draught beer taps. She then proceeded to spray a customer with juice from a draught gun and then sexually assault him multiple times. Upon the arrival of police, she proceeded to resist their attempts to subdue and dress her, striking the officers.

In February 2024, Boorman appeared in court for the May 2023 arrest, pleading guilty to the charges for theft of the alcohol, behaving in a threatening or abusive manner, public indecency, assault, sexual assault, resisting police, and assaulting a PC. Boorman's solicitor informed the court that Boorman was "extremely embarrassed and remorseful", adding that she was "doing well" and that Boorman has a "working diagnosis of complex PTSD", and she is engaging with rehabilitation services. Boorman was placed on the United Kingdom's sex offender registry following her plea, with sentencing deferred until 2 April 2024.
