= Nigel Le Vaillant =

British actor (born 1957)

Nigel Le Vaillant (born 31 August 1957) is a British former actor who worked in BBC television drama during the 1990s. He rose to fame as Dr. Julian Chapman in Casualty and starred as Dr. Paul Dangerfield in Dangerfield.

== Early life ==
Le Vaillant's English father moved to Pakistan after service during the Second World War, and worked in the tea plantation industry there, eventually becoming Chief Executive for Brooke Bond in South Asia. Le Vaillant was born in the country and raised in Karachi. The family returned to England, settling in Sussex when he was 16, although he regularly returned to India in the following years. He was educated at Bryanston school in England and at St Peter's College, Oxford.

== Acting career ==
Le Vaillant began acting soon after the family returned to England, although he initially struggled to find work in the industry and spent nine years unemployed. After short appearances, such as P.C. Miller in The Gentle Touch in 1980, he spent three series in the BBC One drama Casualty playing the character of Dr. Julian Chapman, before leaving to star as the title character in the prime-time BBC series Dangerfield. He left the production in 1997, having married former Casualty star Nicola Jeffries two years earlier. He also appeared in the short-lived sitcom Honey for Tea, and in the cinema film Tom's Midnight Garden, playing the adult Tom. His performance of Volpone at Oxford Playhouse (1980) was noted approvingly by William W. E. Slights in Ben Jonson and the Art of Secrecy (1994).

Le Vaillant briefly returned to acting in 2009 to play British Prime Minister Edward Heath in the BBC television drama Margaret.

== Post acting life ==
Le Vaillant abandoned the acting profession in the early 2000s, being uneasy with the fame that comes with being a recognized figure on national television, and regularly visits Southern India.
