= Anne Kristen =

Scottish actress (1937–1996)

- Born: Anne Kristen Biles; 7 March 1937; Glasgow, U.K.
- Died: 7 August 1996 (aged 59)
- Occupation: Actress
- Years active: 1960-1996
- Spouse: Iain Cuthbertson (1964-1988)

Anne Kristen (7 March 1937 – 7 August 1996) was a Scottish actress, best known for her television roles, including Olive Rowe in Coronation Street, Miss Meiklejohn in Hamish Macbeth, Molly Farmer in Wings, and Norma Sullivan in Casualty.

== Early life and education ==
Kristen was born in 1937 in Glasgow, and grew up in the suburb of Bearsden. Her father, Reginald Biles, was a senior journalist and lead writer for the Glasgow Herald. She acted in plays at the Laurel Bank school in Glasgow. After leaving school, she went on to study at the Royal College of Music and Dramatic Art in Glasgow, where she won a Silver Medal for her work. Kristen then went on to further stage work in Scotland and London before embarking on a television career.

== Career ==
=== Theatre ===
| Year | Title | Role | Company | Director | Notes |
|---|---|---|---|---|---|
| 1982 | Ane Satyre of the Thrie Estaites | Veritie | Scottish Theatre Company | Tom Fleming | play by Sir David Lindsay, adapted by Robert Kemp |

=== Radio ===
| Year | Title | Role | Producer | Station | Notes |
|---|---|---|---|---|---|
| 14 December 1997 | The Secret Commonwealth | Annie's mother | Patrick Rayner | BBC Radio 4 | play by John Purser |

=== Early television career ===
Kristen's first role was on BBC Sunday-Night Play in 1960, for one episode, as the character Nellie Watson. She then appeared in Doctor Finlay's Casebook for two episodes in 1963 and 1966, with a later guest appearance on Doctor Finlay in 1994. Throughout the 1960s she made numerous one-episode appearances in various TV series. She was in The Expert for three episodes in 1969. Her best-known early role was in Coronation Street, in 1971, as Olive Rowe.

=== Regular TV appearances ===
Between her debut and her death in 1996, Kristen continued making regular one-episode television appearances, such as in Z-Cars in 1973 and The Prime of Miss Jean Brodie in 1978. Other notable TV series in which she played a role were Play For Today (two episodes in 1976 and 1981), Grange Hill (two episodes in 1983) and Minder (two episodes in 1985). She also played Professor Maggie McLeish in Taggart, a Scottish detective television program taking place in her birth town of Glasgow, for two episodes in 1986 and 1994.

=== Longest-lasting TV roles ===
Kristen appeared in Wings as Molly Farmer, for one episode in 1976. She then came back for 15 episodes throughout 1977 and 1978. She played in King's Royal as Mrs. Veitch for 14 episodes in 1982 and 1983. "It's nice to be able to wear modern clothes. I'm so tired of wearing corsets," she said of the King's Royal role. Between 1991 and 1993, she was in multiple episodes of Casualty (TV series) as receptionist Norma Sullivan. Her longest-lasting role was as Miss Meiklejohn in Hamish Macbeth. She appeared in 17 episodes in 1995 and 1996.

=== Film ===
Silent Scream (1990) was Kristen's only film.

== Personal life ==
Kristen was married to the actor Iain Cuthbertson from January 1964 until their divorce in 1988. She died from pancreatic cancer on 7 August 1996, at age 59. Her ashes are buried in Ancrum Churchyard, beside her mother and father, in Roxburghshire.
