= Mamta Kaash =

British actress

Mamta Kash
- Born: 29 March 1964 (age 62); India
- Occupations: Actress, producer, presenter
- Known for: Casualty, Angels “ Shalom Salaam”
- Awards: Actor: Cannes Festival International de Programmes Audiovisuels, best actress award for Shalom Salaam, 1989; Producer: Moscow International Film Festival nomination for Delight, 2013 & for “Delirium” 2015

Mamta Kash (born 29 March 1964) is an actress and producer who has worked in television, radio and theatre in the UK. Born in India, she is the daughter of a journalist for the BBC World Service.

As an actress, she is perhaps best known for her roles in the BBC1 medical dramas Casualty, in which she played Dr Beth Ramanee, and Angels, as Nargis Khan. , “Shalom Salaam” as Mumtaz 1989 & Yorkshire TV- “Emmerdale Farm” In 1986, she appeared in the long-running Yorkshire Television soap opera Emmerdale Farm. She also appeared in the Scottish soap opera River City, 2002 playing the role of Hana Malik. Mamta also played the role of Mahatma Gandhi's adopted daughter Abha Chatterjee in the British television series Lord Mountbatten: The Last Viceroy &

Yorkshire TV Emmerdale Farm

Theatre roles have included Moti Roti Puttli Chunni at Theatre Royal Stratford East (1993) and MAA at the Royal Court Theatre (1995). “Journey to West “ Tara Arts theatre ,( 2002, “Domestic Crusaders”, Tara theatre 2010, SILENCE Theatre tour 2024 ,recently, Kaash has focused on work as a producer.

In 2013 she once again collaborated with director Gareth Jones as a co-producer of the film Delight, an awards nominee at the Moscow International Film Festival. and on feature film , in official selection at Moscow IFF , for “Delirium “

== Awards ==
Kaash won Best Actress award at the 1989 Cannes Festival International de Programmes Audiovisuels for her performance in the five-part BBC2 drama Shalom Salaam, a role for which she received widespread critical acclaim, with the drama also winning best screenplay for writer/director Gareth Jones.
