= Holby =

Fictional city

- Casualty, Holby City, HolbyBlue location
- Created by: Jeremy Brock and Paul Unwin
- Genre: Drama

In-universe information
- Type: Fictional city
- Locations: Holby City Hospital; Holby South; Holby International

Holby is a fictional city in the United Kingdom, the setting for the BBC medical dramas Casualty and Holby City, and the police drama HolbyBlue. It is based on the real city of Bristol, where Casualty was formerly filmed, and is notionally located in the fictional county of Wyvern in South West England, not far from the border with Wales. While Casualty has been filmed in Cardiff since 2011, Holby City was filmed in Elstree, Hertfordshire. Both shows are set in the same fictional Holby City Hospital. Holby has an airport called Holby International.

== Holby City Hospital ==
Holby City Hospital
- Holby City NHS Foundation Trust

Geography
- Location: Holby, Wyvern, England

Organisation
- Care system: NHS
- Type: Major Acute / Teaching

Services
- Emergency department: Yes

Helipads
- Helipad: Yes

History
- Founded: 1869

Links
- Lists: Hospitals in England

Holby City Hospital is the fictional hospital within the city in which Casualty and Holby City are set. It is based on the Bristol Royal Infirmary which the original script writers spent time observing in the 1980s in order to garner ideas for Casualty. Although both shows are set in the same hospital, Casualty is primarily filmed in Cardiff, whilst Holby City was filmed in Hertfordshire at BBC Elstree Centre.

The indoor shots for the first series of Casualty were filmed at BBC Television Centre in London. By Series 2, a permanent interior set was built in a warehouse on Kingsland trading estate in the St. Philip's area of Bristol, close to where the exterior shots of the A&E and hospital were filmed. The exterior shots of the hospital used in Casualty were formerly filmed at the City of Bristol College; location filming later moved to an industrial estate in Lawrence Hill, close to the interior set of the hospital.

It was announced on 15 October 2008 that the BBC was considering moving the filming of Casualty to studios in Cardiff. On 26 March 2009, the BBC confirmed the move. Since late 2011, Casualty has been filmed on a purpose built studio and backlot set at the BBC's Roath Lock studios in Cardiff Bay.

=== Wards and departments ===
In Casualty, the primary location is the hospital's Emergency Department (formerly referred to as Accident and Emergency), which has its own adjoining Clinical Decisions Unit, introduced in Series 25, Episode 4 "Only the Lonely". Downton and Perry psychiatric wards are shown at Holby in Series 25, Episode 23 "Place of Safety".

Holby City is set between the hospital's Acute Assessment Unit (ground floor), and Keller (third floor) and Darwin (sixth floor) wards, providing General and Cardiothoracic surgical care respectively. Holby expanded by adding "HolbyCare", a private healthcare ward led by Michael Spence adjacent to the existing Intensive Care Unit on the fifth floor (Series 10, Episode 14 "Stolen").

Former storylines have also focused around the hospital's Otter ward, providing pediatric care, as well as its maternity ward. Otter ward has not featured in the show since series four, whilst the maternity ward ceased usage as a primary location in series eight.

In Casualty@Holby City, Nightingale, a mothballed wing of the hospital, is used to perform a major heart transplant on a small girl by Connie Beauchamp and Harry Harper while the hospital burns.

Other wards of the hospital to be referenced include Berkley, Clifton, Curie (disused), Florence, Geraint Morris, Hitchcock (psychiatric), Linnaeus, Swift and St Clares as well as the paediatric, neonatal, burns and neuro ICUs.

=== List of wards/departments ===
- Emergency Department (ED)
- Clinical Decisions Unit (CDU)
- Assessment Department (AAU) (ground floor)
- Keller Ward (third floor), General Surgery
- Darwin Ward (sixth floor), Cardiothoracics
- Nightingale Wing (disused), General Medicine
- Clifton Ward, Orthopaedics
- Curie Ward (disused), Oncology
- Geraint Morris Ward, Paediatric ITU
- Hitchcock Ward (psychiatric)
- Downton and Perry Ward (psychiatric)
- Linnaeus Ward, Burns ICU
- St Clares, Drugs & Alcohol Rehabilitation
- Otter Ward, Obstetrics & Gynecology
- Sunny-Care Ward, Paediatric ICU
- Miracle Ward, Neonatal ICU
- Guy Self Neurosurgery Centre, Neurosurgery
- Newton Ward, Fracture Clinic
- Einstein Ward, Day Care Unit
- Ear, Nose and Throat Care (ENT)
- Genitourinary Medicine
- Pharmacy
- Rheumatology Department
- Wards 1-8, Post-Operative Care
- Franklin Ward, Maternity Unit
- Spock Ward, Children's Centre
- X-ray Department
- CT Scanning Department
- MRI Scanning Department
- Rainsbury Ward, Breast Clinic
- Priessnitz Ward, Physiotherapy & Hydrotherapy
- Coronary Care Unit (CCU)
- Geriatrics Department
- Gastroenterology Department
- Haematology Department
- Dialysis and Renal Care
- Urology Department
- Ophthalmology Department
- Maxillofacial Department

== Holby Ambulance Service ==
Holby Ambulance Service NHS Foundation Trust
- Type: NHS Foundation Trust
- Headquarters: Holby
- Region served: Wyvern, England

Holby Ambulance Service is the fictional ambulance service which serves Holby City Hospital - also appearing in the two hospital dramas Casualty and Holby City. Although the ambulance service was only seen in Holby City very rarely, Casualty has featured paramedic characters as a key part of the cast since the show's 1986 conception.

== Holby South ==
Holby South is the fictional police station in which HolbyBlue was based in its two series run.
