= Geraint Morris =

British film director (1941–1997)

- Born: Geraint Morris; 28 March 1941; Merthyr Tydfil, Wales
- Died: 12 July 1997 (aged 56); Chepstow, Wales
- Occupations: Film and television director and producer

Geraint Morris (28 March 1941 – 12 July 1997) was a Welsh film and television director and producer.

== Career ==
Morris joined BBC Wales in 1963 after graduating from the University College of North Wales in Bangor.

His first work as a director was on Sutherland's Law. Later contributions included Barlow at Large, The Onedin Line and Juliet Bravo.

During the 1970s, Morris became a producer, beginning with the television police drama Softly, Softly: Task Force, from 1973 to 1976.

By 1980, Morris had completed his career change to dedicate his working life to TV producing. He helped create the highly successful and long running hospital drama Casualty and contributed to the series for its first three seasons before leaving at the end of 1988. He also produced 12 episodes of the police drama The Bill during 1989 before returning to Casualty in 1990 for two series. His final contributions to television production were Wycliffe and Summer of Love, both of which were aired in 1997.

When Casualty built a new set in Cardiff, one of the wards at the fictional hospital was named Geraint Morris.

== Death ==
Geraint Morris died of lung cancer in July 1997, at the age of 56.

== Filmography ==
- Sutherland's Law (1973)
- Barlow at Large (1973-1975)
- Softly, Softly: Task Force (1973-1976)
- The Onedin Line (1977-1980)
- King's Royal (1982-1983)
- Juliet Bravo (1983-1985)
- The Collectors (1986)
- Casualty (1986-1988 & 1990-1992)
- The Bill (1989)
- Bookmark (1993)
- Wycliffe (1994-1997)
- Yn Gymysg Oll i Gyd (All Mixed Up, 1995)
- Pam Fi, Duw? (Why Me, God? 1996)
- Summer of Love (1997)
