= Caroline Webster =

English actress

- Born: 1964 (age 61–62); Kent, England
- Occupations: Actress, photographer
- Years active: 1988—

Caroline Webster (born 1964) is an English former actress who is now a freelance film director and headshot photographer. During her acting career, she appeared as Jane Scott in BBC One's popular hospital drama Casualty for four series.

== Career overview ==
Caroline Webster appeared in several British television series, beginning with one-off roles in London's Burning (1988), All Creatures Great and Small (1990) and The Bill (1991).

Her key role came in 1990, when she appeared as paramedic Jane Scott in Casualty. She appeared in 66 episodes between September 1990 and February 1994.

Her last known television role was in a 2001 episode of Hollyoaks.

She wrote and produced a short film, entitled Fluke, which sparked her interest in being behind the camera. This resulted in her setting up Manx Multimedia Centre, a training and production base, on the Isle of Man.

She went on to train others in "acting on screen" at the East 15 Acting School in Essex and the Actors Centre in London.
