= Derek Thompson (actor) =

British actor (born 1948)

- Born: 4 April 1948 (age 78); Belfast, Northern Ireland
- Occupation: Actor
- Years active: 1961–present
- Known for: Casualty
- Spouse(s): Christine (m. 1967; div. 1978); Dee Sadler (m. 1989)
- Children: 2

Derek Thompson (born 4 April 1948) is a British actor and former singer who is best known as Charlie Fairhead in Casualty, a role he portrayed for 38 years from the show's inception in 1986 to 2024. He made a guest return in 2026 to mark the 40th anniversary.

His other credits include Gonks Go Beat (1965), Yanks (1979), Breaking Glass (1980), The Long Good Friday (1980), The Gentle Touch (1980–1982), Brookside (1983), Wild Geese II (1985), Resurrection Man (1998), Holby City (1999, 2012) and Blue Lights (2024).

== Early life ==
Thompson was born in and is from Belfast and has a twin sister. During their teenage years, they combined to form the singing duo Elaine and Derek. They recorded four albums and 15 EPs together, singing in harmonies, and released one eponymously titled album on the Parlophone label in 1961. They then formed the folk trio Odin's People with Larry Johns, and recorded two singles in 1967.

== Career ==
Thompson appeared in the feature film Gonks Go Beat (1965).

From 1976, he appeared in many early productions at the National Theatre, London's new South Bank home.

In the late 1970s and early 1980s, Thompson became a regular face in BBC and ITV dramas. Appearances include Softly, Softly, Play for Today, and Rock Follies of 77. He got a big break in Harry's Game, in which he played the lead IRA gunman on the run following the assassination of a government minister. Later, he played another IRA hitman in the TV series The Price and for a British mercenary gang in the Wild Geese II (1985).

During the same period, Thompson had minor film roles in Yanks (1979) and Breaking Glass (1980), and played Jeff, Harold Shand's lieutenant, in the film The Long Good Friday. Before Thompson appeared in Casualty, he had a recurring role, as DS Jimmy Fenton, in the ITV police drama The Gentle Touch, and played William Thurley in Channel 4's Brookside in 1983.

=== Casualty ===
Thompson began portraying Charlie Fairhead in Casualty in 1986. The following year, he met his future wife, Dee Sadler, an actress playing the role of Maggie in an episode of the show's second series, a potholer who had to be rescued from a cave before hospitalisation. Thompson played the role of Charlie for more than 30 years, and was the last remaining character from the original cast until his departure on 16 March 2024. In 2004, his character went on a six-month sabbatical, which was his most notable absence from the show. In his latter years with the programme, he was allowed a few months off from filming each year.

Apart from in Casualty, he has also played Charlie in the spin-off shows Holby City and HolbyBlue. It was revealed in July 2017 that Thompson was the BBC's highest-paid actor, earning between £350,000 and £400,000 over the previous financial year. In 2023, it was announced that, after 38 years, Thompson would be leaving Casualty; his exit aired in March 2024, at the conclusion of a special two-part episode. In 2026, Thompson made a brief return to the role to celebrate the fortieth anniversary of Casualty.

== Family ==
As of 2010, Thompson and his wife, Dee, lived in a rented flat in Bristol; they also own a house in Brixton. The couple have a son, who appeared as a baby in one 1990 episode of Casualty, as the son of regular character Duffy, and he also has an older son by a previous marriage to Christine, a theatre director.

A sufferer of dystonia, Thompson became patron of the Dystonia Society in 2006.

== Theatre ==
Most of Thompson's theatrical work was in London between 1975 and 1985, mainly for the National Theatre, but also at the Garrick, Half Moon and Old Vic theatres.

- Strawberry Fields
- WC/PC
- The Bells of Hell
- The Garden of England
- Serjeant Musgrave's Dance
- The Cherry Orchard
- The Passion
- Dispatches
- The Mysteries
- Weapons of Happiness
- Lavender Blue
- Has Washington Legs
- School for Scandal

== Filmography ==
=== Film ===
Year	Title	Role	Director	Notes
1964	Gonks Go Beat	Ballad Isle Singer	Robert Hartford-Davis	
1979	Yanks	Ken	John Schlesinger	
1980	Breaking Glass	Andy	Brian Gibson	
1980	The Long Good Friday	Jeff	John Mackenzie	
1985	Wild Geese II	Hourigan	Peter R. Hunt	
1998	Resurrection Man	Herbie Ferguson	Marc Evans	
2016	Penny from Heaven	Homeless Man	Marlek Al-Habib	Short film

=== Television ===
Year	Title	Role	Notes
1976	Softly, Softly: Task Force	Dave Marshall	Episode: "At Risk" (8.10)
1977	Play for Today	Chet	Episode: "A Photograph" (7.13)
1977	Rock Follies of '77	Harry Moon	6 episodes
1978	Me! I'm Afraid of Virginia Woolf	Skinner	Television play
1979	The Danedyke Mystery	Tom Richards	6 episodes
1980
1980	Minder	Harry	Episode: "The Old School Tie" (2.10)
1980–1982	The Gentle Touch	Det. Sgt. Jimmy Fenton	25 episodes
1982
1982	Harry's Game	Billy Downes	3 episodes
1983	Bergerac	Wyatt	Episode: "A Miracle Every Week" (2.7)
1983	Women	Jonathan	Episode: "Hard to Get" (1.3)
1983–1984	Brookside	Will Thurley	6 episodes
1984
1985	The Price	Frank Crossan	6 episodes
1986	Fighting Back	Bruce Curran	3 episodes
1986–2024, 2026	Casualty	Charlie Fairhead	Main role, 903 episodes
1992, 1994	Children in Need	Himself	Television specials
1999–2012	Holby City	Charlie Fairhead	4 episodes
2001	Through the Keyhole	Himself	Participant
2007	Gina's Laughing Gear	Himself	Episode: "Dollby City" (1.8)
2007	HolbyBlue	Charlie Fairhead	Episode #1.1
2014	You Saw Them Here First	Himself	Television special
2024	Blue Lights	Robin Graham	Series 2: 5 episodes
2025	Vera	Gordon Spencer	episode: "The Dark Wives" (14.2)
