= Nursing management =

Profession

Nursing management consists of the performance of the leadership functions of governance and decision-making within organizations employing nurses. It includes processes common to all management like planning, organizing, staffing, directing and controlling. It is common for registered nurses to seek additional education to earn a Master of Science in Nursing or Doctor of Nursing Practice to prepare for leadership roles within nursing. Management positions increasingly require candidates to hold an advanced degree in nursing.

== Roles ==
=== Head of the nursing staff ===
The chief nurse, in other words the person in charge of nursing in a hospital and the head of the nursing staff, is called nursing officer in UK English, and head nurse or director of nursing in US English, and matron or nursing superintendent in Indian English.

The chief nurse is a registered nurse who supervises the care of all the patients at a health care facility. The chief nurse is the senior nursing management position in an organization and often holds executive titles like chief nursing officer (CNO), chief nurse executive, or vice-president of nursing. They typically report to the CEO or COO.

The chief nurse serves as "the head of the general staff of the hospital" and is obeyed by his/her subordinate nurses. Traditionally, chief nurses were called matrons and wore a dark-blue dress that was usually darker than that of her subordinates, who were also known as sisters, in addition to a white-starched hat. As such, matrons usually "provide strong leadership and act as a link between Board-level nurses and clinical practice". In military hospitals of the United States, matrons were "charged with the responsibility of making twice daily rounds to supervise the [common] nurses' duty performance".

The American Organization of Nurse Executives is a professional association for directors of nursing.

==== Service directors ====
Many large healthcare organizations also have service directors. These directors have oversight of a particular service within the facility or system (surgical services, women's services, emergency services, critical care services, etc.). Often these directors are over managers of those service lines.

=== Nurse manager ===
The nurse manager is the nurse with management responsibilities of a nursing unit. They typically report to a service director. They have primary responsibilities for staffing, budgeting, and day-to-day operations of the unit, bed site teaching, complaint investigations and conducting educational programs at unit base.

=== Charge nurse ===
The charge nurse is the nurse, usually assigned for a shift, who is responsible for the immediate functioning of the unit. The charge nurse is responsible for making sure nursing care is delivered safely and that all the patients on the unit are receiving adequate care. They are typically the frontline management in most nursing units. Some charge nurses are permanent members of the nursing management team and are called shift supervisors. The term for a female charge nurse was traditionally a nursing sister (or just sister), and this term is still commonly used in some countries (such as the United Kingdom and some Commonwealth countries). Some patients address a sister by Sister followed by her given name, for example, Sister Patricia.

== Related material ==
- Nurse Manager Core Competencies: A Proposal in the Spanish Health System. International Journal of Environmental Research and Public Health. 2020; 17(9):3173. https://doi.org/10.3390/ijerph17093173
- Modelo de competencias para la gestora enfermera. Metas Enferm dic 2019/ene 2020; 22(10):5-13. DOI: https://doi.org/10.35667/MetasEnf.2019.22.1003081511
- Competency Model for the Middle Nurse Manager (MCGE-Logistic Level). International Journal of Environmental Research and Public Health. 2021; 18(8):3898. https://doi.org/10.3390/ijerph18083898
- Nurse managers’ competencies: A scoping review. J Nurs Manag. 2021; 29: 1410– 1419. https://doi.org/10.1111/jonm.13380
- Modelo de competencias para la gestora enfermera del nivel operativo. Metas Enferm mar 2022; 25(2):49-55. Doi: https://doi.org/10.35667/MetasEnf.2022.25.1003081885
- A competency model for nurse executives. International Journal of Nursing Practice, e13058. https://doi.org/10.1111/ijn.13058
