= Casualty series 30 =

Thirtieth series of Casualty

Casualty
- Series 30
- Starring: William Beck; Alistair Brammer; Charles Dale; Jamie Davis; Jason Durr; Lloyd Everitt; Jaye Griffiths; Chelsea Halfpenny; Jane Hazlegrove; Amanda Henderson; Chloe Howman; Tony Marshall; Lee Mead; Amanda Mealing; Azuka Oforka; George Rainsford; Sunetra Sarker; Michael Stevenson; Cathy Shipton; Derek Thompson; Charles Venn; Richard Winsor; Crystal Yu
- No. of episodes: 43

Release
- Original network: BBC One; BBC One HD
- Original release: 29 August 2015 – 30 July 2016

Series chronology
- ← Previous; Series 29 Next → Series 31

The thirtieth series of the British medical drama television series Casualty commenced airing in the United Kingdom on BBC One on 29 August 2015 and finished on 30 July 2016. The series consisted of 43 episodes, including the broadcast of the show's 1000th episode on 25 June 2016. Erika Hossington continued her role as series producer, while Oliver Kent continued his role as the show's executive producer. Seventeen cast members reprised their roles from the previous series with five actors, including three long-serving cast members, departing during this series. Chelsea Halfpenny appeared in the serial between September and November 2015 as F2 Alicia Munroe, reprising the role as a main cast member in July 2016. Alistair Brammer joined the cast for a four-month guest stint as receptionist Jack Diamond in December 2015. Three new regular cast members joined the serial in spring 2016: Lloyd Everitt as paramedic Jez Andrews; Jason Durr as staff nurse David Hide; and Jaye Griffiths as consultant Elle Gardner.

The opening two episodes of the series were written and directed by the show's co-creator, Paul Unwin. In addition to Unwin writing and directing the first two episodes, it was also revealed that he had contributed to one of the series major storylines, which saw brothers Cal and Ethan learn they were adopted. The series annual Christmas special episode received mixed criticism from journalist Matt Baylis, who was impressed that the show "still finds ways to reinvent itself" despite "going longer than the Nativity", however felt the episode was "slightly let down by the fine detail". Throughout the series, Hossington and Kent teased the show's build-up to the thirtieth anniversary episode, hinting that "something major" would happen to one of the "lead characters that will take them a very long time to recover from."

During series thirty, Casualty was awarded Best Drama at the Inside Soap Awards. In addition to this, the show was also shortlisted under the Best Drama category at the National Television Awards in 2016, however lost to rival Downton Abbey. On 14 February 2016, the BBC revealed that Casualty was the sixth most-loved programme on BBC iPlayer. The show was also nominated TV Soap of the Year at the 2016 Television and Radio Industries Club (TRIC) awards, however lost to rival soap EastEnders. Despite this, Casualty did receive the TRIC Special Award in special recognition of its thirtieth year on air in September 2016.

== Production ==
Oliver Kent continued his role as Executive Producer, while Erika Hossington remained as Series Producer. This series consisted of 43 episodes. As the show built towards its thirtieth anniversary in 2016, Hossington revealed in an interview that the special episode will do something "no other show has done before." In the interview, Hossington said: "I'm very keen to make it a big event! We spoke about live episodes and things like that, but we decided that none of those things were satisfying as they've all been done. What we're doing, no other show has done before ..." Producer of Holby City, Simon Harper, also announced in an interview plans for a crossover event with sister show Holby City in celebration for Casualty's thirtieth anniversary. It was later revealed by Charles Venn in an interview with What's on TV on 8 June 2016, that his character, Nurse Jacob Masters, would be at the forefront of the anniversary episode. Venn said in the interview his character would play "an integral part" in the 110-minute special anniversary episode. Venn also went on to say that the cast and crew brand the thirtieth anniversary episode Casualty: The Movie.

In a more recent interview with Hossington, she revealed that the current ongoing storyline involving Ethan and Cal was pitched by co-creator Paul Unwin. The storyline saw Cal struggle to come to terms with the revelation that he and Ethan are adopted. This prompted Cal to go searching for his birth mother along with Charlie in episode sixteen where another secret was exposed when Cal found out his birth mother, Emilie Groome (Carol Royle) had Huntington's disease. The episode itself attracted an audience of 6.88 million viewers.

Casualty aired one of its biggest storylines ever in the summer of 2016, as the show celebrated its thirtieth anniversary. August 2016 saw the show air 'an enormous stunt'. Hossington also revealed in an earlier interview in 2015 that, as part of the thirtieth anniversary, 'the hospital itself will be in jeopardy.' Kent commented on the storyline saying: 'We'll bring in some Holby characters, plus some other faces from the past and something major will happen to one of our lead characters that will take them a very long time to recover from — the ramifications will be felt in the ED for some time.'

For a second series running, the revamped theme tune introduced back in January 2014 during Series 28 remained the same with the exception of episode two that saw the use of the first ever theme tune and title card, with the original 1986 theme tune playing over a montage of Series 1 and Series thirty characters. Albeit with the closing credits remaining the same. The titles are modified as characters arrive or depart throughout the course of the series.

== Cast ==
=== Overview ===
The thirtieth series of Casualty featured a cast of characters working in the fictitious emergency department of Holby City Hospital. The majority of the cast from the previous series continued to appear in this series. Amanda Mealing appeared as the clinical lead and a consultant in emergency medicine Connie Beauchamp, whilst Sunetra Sarker and William Beck appeared as consultants Zoe Hanna and Dylan Keogh. George Rainsford, Richard Winsor and Crystal Yu portrayed specialist registrars Ethan Hardy, Caleb "Cal" Knight and Lily Chao. Chloe Howman starred as clinical nurse manager Rita Freeman, whilst Derek Thompson continued his role of senior charge nurse and emergency nurse practitioner Charlie Fairhead. Charles Venn appeared as senior staff nurse and later clinical nurse manager Jacob Masters, whilst Lee Mead appeared as staff nurse, later senior staff nurse Ben "Lofty" Chiltern. Amanda Henderson starred as staff nurse Robyn Miller and Charles Dale appeared as healthcare assistant Mackenzie "Big Mac" Chalker. Jamie Davis appeared as porter Max Walker. Tony Marshall and Azuka Oforka portrayed receptionist Noel Garcia and Louise Tyler, the latter becoming a staff nurse early in the series. Jane Hazlegrove appeared as operational duty manager and paramedic Kathleen "Dixie" Dixon, whilst Michael Stevenson starred as Iain Dean. Chelsee Healey and Gregory Forsyth-Foreman also appeared as Honey Wright and Louis Fairhead in a recurring capacity.

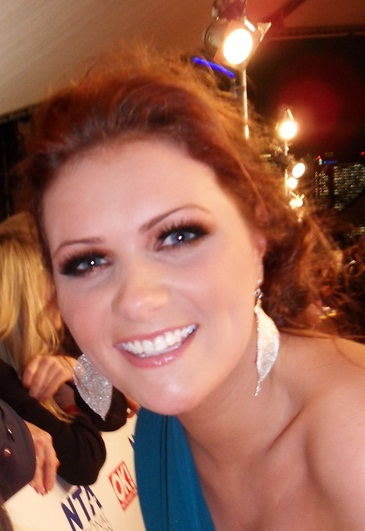
Chelsea Halfpenny joined the cast as F2 doctor, Alicia Munroe.

Chelsea Halfpenny joined the cast as a foundation doctor undergoing the second year of foundation training, Alicia Munroe. She debuted on-screen in episode four, which was broadcast on 19 September 2015. She departed from the series in episode eleven, at the conclusion of a workplace bullying storyline. Halfpenny confirmed on 29 July 2016 that she would return as a regular cast member, commenting that she was "so excited and humbled". Alicia returned in the final episode of the series, broadcast on 30 July. Alistair Brammer made his first appearance in episode fourteen, broadcast on 5 December 2015, as receptionist Jack Diamond. Jack departed in episode thirty-two. Lloyd Everitt's casting in the role of paramedic Jez Andrews was announced in January 2016, with Kent describing him as "young, handsome and openly bisexual. Everitt said he was "honoured" to join "such a successful show". Jason Durr and Jaye Griffiths were also announced to be joining the regular cast on 24 February 2016, as staff nurse David Hide and consultant Elle Gardner. David was characterised as a "shy and socially awkward man", whilst Elle was described as "a little out of practise", but able to "work brilliantly". Of Jez, David and Elle, Kent said: "They will be taking on very different roles and will be embarking on their own brilliantly vibrant, bold and gripping stories each Saturday night. Jez arrived in episode twenty-seven, which aired on 12 March 2016, David in episode thirty-three, on 30 April 2016, and Elle in episode thirty-four, on 7 May 2016.

Lee Mead departed from his role of senior staff nurse, Ben "Lofty" Chiltern.

Louis Fairhead (Forsyth-Foreman) left the series in episode two, whilst Honey Wright (Healey) departed the show in episode four. Hazlegrove's decision to leave her role of Kathleen "Dixie" Dixon was announced in January 2016. Hazlegrove, who had appeared in the series for almost 10 years, left in episode twenty-one, broadcast on 30 January 2016. After two years in the role of Ben "Lofty" Chiltern, Mead chose to leave the show and Lofty departed in episode twenty-seven. Mead cited wanting to spend time with his daughter as his reasons for leaving. The break was originally credited as temporary, but Mead did not return and instead joined the cast of Holby City in 2017. Sarker departed from the show in episode thirty-four following nine years in the role of Zoe Hanna. Her exit had not been announced prior to transmission, surprising viewers. Sarker described her time on the show as "a privilege and a pleasure", before thanking cast, crew and the "wonderful fans". Kent commented that he "missed" Sarker on-set. Dale's decision to leave the series was announced on 7 June 2016, with his character Mackenzie "Big Mac" Chalker departing in episode thirty-eight at the conclusion of his drug addiction storyline. The show paid tribute to Dale with a montage of his time on the show, whilst Kent described Dale as "old school" following his exit. Howman departed from her role of Rita Freeman in episode forty-two after less than three years in the role. The show paid tribute to Howman in a montage video.

Cathy Shipton guest starred as original character Lisa "Duffy" Duffin in the two-part series opener. Her guest return was announced on 24 August 2015, with Shipton commenting, "I was surprised and delighted to be asked to recreate the role of 'Duffy' to launch the 30th series – especially as Paul Unwin, one of the original creators, was not only writing but also directing." Shipton's permanent return to the series was announced on 7 June 2016, with Kent commenting, "All of us at Casualty are incredibly excited that the fabulous Cathy Shipton has agreed to bring Duffy back to the Emergency Department." Duffy was confirmed to make a guest appearance in episode thirty-nine, the show's thousandth episode, before returning permanently in the following series. Mark Letheren made a guest appearance in episode four as counsellor Ben Harding, a role he has played on-off since 2007. Sarah Jayne Dunn, who appeared for five months in the previous series, made a cameo appearance in episode seven as Cal's ex-girlfriend Taylor Ashbie, before making a more prominent appearance in the red-button episode which followed the episode, entitled "On Call". Guy Henry, who appears regularly in Holby City as the hospital's chief executive officer Henrik Hanssen made three guest appearances throughout the series: episode nineteen, episode thirty-four, and episode thirty-five. Henry previously appeared in several episodes in 2011. Tom Chambers made two guest appearances as his Holby City character Sam Strachan in episodes twenty-three and twenty-four, whilst Emily Carey returned in the role of Grace Beauchamp in a storyline which reunited Sam with Connie, his former partner and Grace's mother. Rosie Marcel made a guest appearance as her Holby City character Jac Naylor in episode twenty-three.

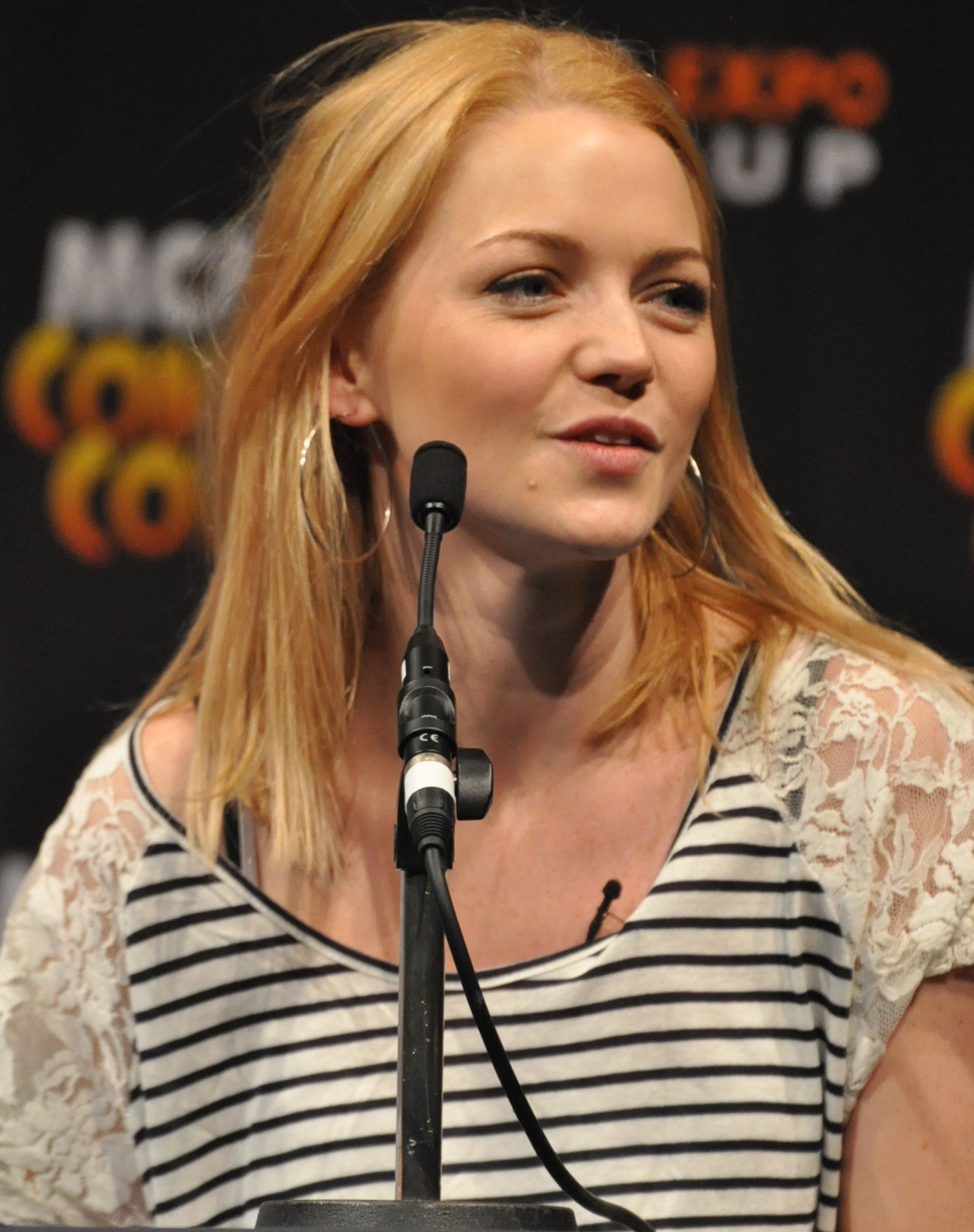
Hannah Spearritt guest starred as drug addict, Mercedes Christie.

Amy Noble made four guest appearances throughout the series as PC Kate Wilkinson. Kerry Bennett joined the cast in a recurring capacity as HART paramedic Jess Cranham in episode six, along with Anna Acton and Grace Doherty, who joined the cast as Jess's partner and daughter Nikki Chisom and Olivia Cranham in episode twelve, were part of a storyline which saw Dixie take "center stage". They were involved in a domestic abuse storyline which concluded in episode eighteen, broadcast on 9 January 2016, when a hostage situation and fire occurred leading to Nikki being arrested. Bennett and Doherty continued to appear in the series until episode twenty-one when they departed alongside Hazlegrove. The show's co-creator Paul Unwin pitched a storyline which saw Ethan and Cal discover they are adopted. Carol Royle was introduced as the brothers' biological mother Emilie Groome in episode sixteen. Her final appearance was made in episode twenty-seven, where she died at the seaside accompanied by Cal and Ethan. Hannah Spearritt joined the cast in a recurring capacity as Mercedes Christie, a drug addict that attacked Noel and later blackmailed Big Mac in a long-running storyline. She made her debut in episode twenty for one episode, and returned for more prominent appearances from episode twenty-four. Kelli Hollis joined the cast in episode twenty-four as Shelle Jones, Mercedes' drug dealer. Mercedes son and partner, Connor Christie and Vince Callaghan were introduced in episode twenty-eight, played by Toby Murray and Andrew Knott respectively. Connor departed in episode thirty-three, whilst Mercedes, Shelle and Vince made their final appearance in the following episode.

Joel Beckett returned to the series for two episodes as Rita's paedophile former husband Mark Richie in episodes thirty-one and thirty-three. Matthew Marsh and Vicky Hall reprised their roles as Dylan's father, Brian Carroll and his partner, Hazel Leyton in episode thirty-five. They continued to appear until episode forty-one. Sydney Wade and Tonicha Lawrence began appearing as Grace's friend Carmel Sims and her mother, Steph in episode thirty-six. They appeared in a storyline which saw Steph psychologically abuse Carmel and later, run Connie and Grace off the road in the end of series cliffhanger. Owain Arthur's casting in the role of Glen Thomas, a love interest for Robyn was announced in May 2016. He debuted in episode thirty-seven, and was involved in a storyline which saw him revealed to have a brain tumour.

=== Main characters ===
- William Beck as Dylan Keogh
- Alistair Brammer as Jack Diamond (episodes 14−32)
- Charles Dale as Big Mac (until episode 38)
- Jamie Davis as Max Walker
- Jason Durr as David Hide (from episode 33)
- Lloyd Everitt as Jez Andrews (from episode 27)
- Jaye Griffiths as Elle Gardner (from episode 34)
- Chelsea Halfpenny as Alicia Munroe (episodes 4−11, from episode 43)
- Jane Hazlegrove as Kathleen "Dixie" Dixon (until episode 21)
- Amanda Henderson as Robyn Miller
- Chloe Howman as Rita Freeman (until episode 42)
- Tony Marshall as Noel Garcia
- Lee Mead as Ben "Lofty" Chiltern (until episode 27)
- Amanda Mealing as Connie Beauchamp
- Azuka Oforka as Louise Tyler
- George Rainsford as Ethan Hardy
- Sunetra Sarker as Zoe Hanna (until episode 34)
- Michael Stevenson as Iain Dean
- Derek Thompson as Charlie Fairhead
- Charles Venn as Jacob Masters
- Richard Winsor as Caleb Knight
- Crystal Yu as Lily Chao

=== Recurring characters ===
- Owain Arthur as Glen Thomas (from episode 37)
- Kerry Bennett as Jess Cranham
- Emily Carey as Grace Beauchamp
- Grace Doherty as Olivia Cranham
- Gregory Forsyth-Foreman as Louis Fairhead (until episode 2)
- Vicky Hall as Hazel Leyton
- Chelsee Healey as Honey Wright (until episode 4)
- Guy Henry as Henrik Hanssen
- Matthew Marsh as Brian Caroll
- Hannah Spearritt as Mercedes Christie (episodes 20−34)

=== Guest characters ===
- Anna Acton as Nikki Chisom
- Joel Beckett as Mark Richie
- Tom Chambers as Sam Strachan
- Sarah Jayne Dunn as Taylor Ashbie
- Kelli Hollis as Shelle Jones
- Andrew Knott as Vince Callaghan
- Tonicha Lawrence as Steph Sims
- Mark Letheren as Ben Harding
- Rosie Marcel as Jac Naylor
- Toby Murray as Connor Christie
- Rukku Nahar as Rosa Sarwar
- Amy Noble as PC Kate Wilkinson
- Carol Royle as Emilie Groome
- Cathy Shipton as Lisa "Duffy" Duffin
- Sydney Wade as Carmel Sims

== Episodes ==
| No. overall | No. in series | Title | Directed by | Written by | Original release date | UK viewers (millions) |
|---|---|---|---|---|---|---|
| 962 | 1 | "A Child's Heart – Part One" | Paul Unwin | Paul Unwin | 29 August 2015 | 5.73 |
Zoe lies under the depths of the freezing water in the lake, held under by the weight of her dress. Dylan makes his way back to shore having survived the explosions on the boathouse. Charlie witnesses Zoe drowning and dives in to rescue her. Zoe is saved and taken back to the ED, where she experiences hypothermia. As the rest of the team return to the ED, Charlie unexpectedly has a huge heart attack and is rushed into Resus. At the same time, Duffy returns to the ED as an agency nurse. Elsewhere, Louise becomes passionate about a couple whose baby is about to die, and a gang of thugs shoot a targeted member of the public at a nightclub, giving Jacob an opportunity to put his newly devised gun-shot wound policy into action. The full script for the episode can be read on the BBC website.
| 963 | 2 | "A Child's Heart – Part Two" | Paul Unwin | Paul Unwin | 30 August 2015 | 6.33 |
Charlie lies in Resus, asystolic. Connie continues CPR on Charlie but Rita doubts his chances of survival and suggests to Connie that she pronounces him dead. Connie declines Rita's suggestion. After the team manage to revive Charlie, Connie books him in for life-saving surgery, however, as the team prepare to take Charlie to theatre Dylan has another obsessive-compulsive-related mental blockage, and tells Connie his patient is in a critical condition and requires immediate surgery. Connie allows Dylan's casualty to go for surgery before Charlie, but complications in theatre lead to a longer wait than expected for Charlie's operation. Despite this, Charlie's life is successfully saved. At the same time, in the ED, the gang violence escalates. Two more casualties are admitted following stabbing incidents, forcing Jacob to take charge of the situation. Elsewhere, Louise applies for a nursing career following a talk with Duffy. The full script for the episode can be read on the BBC website.
| 964 | 3 | "Objectum Sexual" | Claire Winyard | Jeff Povey | 5 September 2015 | 5.95 |
Louise's nursing career gets off to a bad start when her nerves prevent her from helping a patient in Resus, forcing Zoe to ask her to leave. A male is crushed under the ceiling of a condemned building being demolished, although the demolition is cut short when a woman is injured while claiming she is in a relationship with the building. After the two patients are admitted to the ED, Cal learns the woman has objectum sexuality; she later falls in love with the hospital. Honey arrives to work hungover following a drunken night out with Ethan. When a patient asks her if she is in a relationship with Ethan, she tells them she is not. Iain has an assault charge made against him when a traffic warden is injured while attempting to clamp the ambulance on private land.
| 965 | 4 | "Cradle to Grave" | Claire Winyard | Kelly Jones | 19 September 2015 | 5.55 |
Alicia Munroe, a second year foundation doctor, arrives at the ED for her first shift. She is partnered with Lily and the pair work together on a mother-to-be who is admitted following a car crash. In the ED, Lily and Alicia learn their patient is lying to them about her name. Then, even more secrets are revealed as the pair learn their patient's social worker is also the father of the baby. Dylan returns to work following his temporary break. He asks to work with Lofty in an attempt for the pair to reconcile. The two work together to treat a terminally ill cancer patient, but Dylan wrongly finds himself losing his temper with Lofty again when he believes Lofty has disregarded his patient's wishes. Following the misunderstanding, Dylan confides in Lofty about his obsessive-compulsive disorder. Honey and Ethan end their relationship, which prompts Honey to go and set up a business away from Holby City. Jacob asks Connie out on a date, but is rejected.
| 966 | 5 | "Belief" | Steve Hughes | Mark Catley | 26 September 2015 | 5.20 |
A room full of racist supporters are admitted to the ED when a perpetrator smashes a bottle of acid in the room they are meeting in. The perpetrator himself is later admitted after coming off his motorbike while trying to escape the scene. With both the perpetrator and the racist supporters in the ED, chaos shortly breaks out, and the police are called. The commotion in the ED begins to get out of hand when the perpetrator's family arrives armed with guns. Jacob interferes with the perpetrator and his family as he attempts to defuse the situation, however he is shot by the police who mistake him for one of the perpetrators. Connie puts her life on the line to save Jacob, performing life-saving surgery. During the crossfire, Alicia finds herself successfully performing a risky procedure to save another patient's life. Zoe is hopeful that Max can forgive her following recent events.
| 967 | 6 | "All the Single Ladies" | Steve Hughes | Mark Catley | 3 October 2015 | 5.18 |
Iain and Dixie are sent to HART on a training course. The pair arrive and are greeted by team leader Jess Cranham. During their training exercise, a connection forms between Dixie and Jess. Following the training exercise, the HART team are called to a man who has been crushed under a chimney. The team save the man. At the end of her shift, Dixie asks Jess if she will go on a date with her. Dylan and Lofty work together again to treat an accident prone woman. Zoe and Max begin talking again; it is evident their relationship is far from perfect.
| 968 | 7 | "Rules of Attraction" | Diarmuid Goggins | Joe Williams | 10 October 2015 | 5.62 |
Lily receives a phone call from her mother, who reveals her father has died. Lily is upset upon learning the news of her father's demise and takes her anger out on Alicia and her patients. Dixie attends an interview with the adoption board to discuss whether she is eligible to adopt or not. She is told she is not eligible. Iain is injured while saving a casualty from a collapsed platform in a warehouse. Once back in the ED, Rita treats Iain for his injuries, and the pair share a kiss. Dylan continues to work with Lofty, this time helping a patient speak out about her domestic abuse. Elsewhere, Taylor returns to the ED to see Cal. She brings a baby along with her and tells Cal that he is the father of the baby.
| 969 | 8 | "Flutterby" | Steve Brett | Emily Groves & Mark Catley | 17 October 2015 | 5.79 |
Lily returns to work just hours after her father's funeral. When a young patient with a rare medical condition is admitted to the ED Lily fails to accept her patient's wishes of not having a chest drain. It becomes clear to the staff, and in particular Alicia, that Lily's emotional stability is affecting her work performance. Dixie confides in Iain about her rejection from the adoption board. Charlie helps a father and his young daughter come to terms with a death in the family. Cal calls his daughter Matilda. Ethan suggests to Cal that he gets a paternity test to prove that Matilda is his and Cal agrees.
| 970 | 9 | "One Shot" | Steve Brett | Jon Sen | 24 October 2015 | 5.29 |
Jacob goes for a run on the morning he returns to work following the crossfire in the ED. However, while running in the woods, he comes across a casualty experiencing anaphylaxis. As Jacob returns to the ED, Connie questions Jacob's competency at work. He manages to persuade her that he is ready to continue his nursing duties. By the end of the day, Connie finds herself falling for Jacob. Lily's aggressive behaviour towards other staff members continues, but it is Alicia who in particularly feels the wrath. Then, when Alicia informs Connie that Lily is unable to realign a patient's ankle, Lily is furious with Alicia, especially when Alicia receives praise for her quick thinking. Iain learns about Dixie and Rita's kiss from over a year ago.
| 971 | 10 | "Best Served Cold" | Jo Johnson | Nick Fisher | 31 October 2015 | 5.00 |
Jacob learns that the police officer who shot him during the crossfire in the ED will not be prosecuted for shooting him. Angry by the lack of justice, Jacob goes on a mission to discover the name of the police officer. Connie is optimistic about Alicia's progress during her placement at Holby City and encourages her to take her MCEM exams promptly. Connie asks a senior member of staff to write a report on Alicia's progression; Lily takes the task on. Alicia treats a patient with a dislocated shoulder and performs an unfamiliar procedure on his dislocated shoulder. Then, Alicia successfully treats two warring patients. Lily grows jealous of Alicia's professionalism. She criticises her work ethic and, when Connie asks for feedback, claims Alicia is overconfident. Cal continues his new fatherly role as he continues to care for Matilda.
| 972 | 11 | "Avoidable Harm" | Jo Johnson | Matthew Barry | 14 November 2015 | 5.18 |
Alicia treats a young footballer who has injured himself. She takes the footballer's younger brother to get food, but he goes missing. Alicia visits the ambulance station in search of the young boy, but finds herself being held hostage inside a van with a casualty with severe bleeding following a violent argument. As the situation eventually defuses itself, Alicia returns to the ED and proves she is an exceptional doctor, but jealous Lily takes her bullying towards Alicia to a new level, determined to make Alicia leave. Connie also gives Alicia a warning due to her leaving the ED. Alicia is distraught following Lily's harsh words and Connie's warning, and ultimately hands in her resignation and leaves Holby City.
| 973 | 12 | "Strangers" | Sean Glynn | Andy Bayliss | 21 November 2015 | 5.16 |
Dixie and Iain attend a callout to the woodlands following reports of a woman falling down a deep hole. When the pair arrive, they realise their casualty is none other than Jess Cranham, from HART. Once Jess is rescued, Dixie learns that she is in a relationship, and her partner is called Nikki. Dixie becomes concerned for Jess when she finds antidepressants in her bag, but Iain tells Dixie she is being paranoid and overprotective. Lily finds herself isolated from the rest of the team as they learn Alicia left because of Lily's bullying. Cal's day with Matilda takes a worrying turn when he finds a rash on her and she has a raised temperature. He admits her to the ED, but Cal's paranoia over Matilda causes him to breakdown. Then, Cal receives the paternity test results: Matilda is not his biological daughter. Cal is distraught and walks out of the ED.
| 974 | 13 | "Estranged" | Sean Glynn | Mark Stevenson | 28 November 2015 | 5.25 |
Cal is in disbelief following the paternity test results. He decides to prove the test results are wrong by discovering his own blood group. The blood results come back and Cal is dealt another shock – he is adopted. Cal struggles to accept the results of the paternity and blood test, and after handing over Matilda to social services, he goes and gets drunk, and sleeps with a stranger. A young gay couple's wedding day is jeopardised when the venue collapses and an unsupportive father follows the couple into the ED. Connie is impressed by Jacob's ability to control his anger when Louise hands over an uncooperative patient to him. After Jacob discharges his patient, he and Connie have an arm wrestle in the staff room, and it is evident there is chemistry between the two.
| 975 | 14 | "Maybe This Year" | Seán Gleeson | Jeff Povey | 5 December 2015 | 5.22 |
Iain and Dixie are involved in an ambulance crash outside the ED as the ice and harsh winter conditions set in. The team pull together to help those involved in the accident, ultimately bringing Connie and Jacob even closer together. By the end of the day, Jacob and Connie sleep together. New receptionist Jack Diamond arrives at the hospital and notices a lack of Christmas decorations. He makes it his mission to make the hospital more festive. Cal returns to work, hungover, and works with Louise on a patient harbouring a secret. Dixie is concerned when Olivia, Jess's daughter, arrives at the ED with suspicious injuries under Nikki's care.
| 976 | 15 | "Silence Speaks" | Seán Gleeson | Claire Miller | 12 December 2015 | 5.67 |
Connie arrives at work the morning after sleeping with Jacob. She is determined to keep their relationship a secret, but when a patient with advanced motor neuron disease is admitted to the ED and Jacob takes control of his patient care, Connie's past with Alfred resurfaces, and she becomes angry about Jacob making decisions on his patient's behalf, leading to her inadvertently revealing that she had sex with him. A mother and son are admitted after a car crash and Dylan, Lofty and Robyn work together to treat them. Dixie goes to the HART training centre to talk to Jess about her relationship with Nikki. Jess tells Dixie she needs to stop intervening in other people's relationships. A new Band Six Nursing position is advertised and Lofty and Robyn both apply for the role, unaware each other are applying.
| 977 | 16 | "Home for Christmas" | Jamie Annett | Sally Abbott & Mark Catley | 19 December 2015 | 6.88 |
Cal goes to visit his biological mother with Charlie following a successful breakthrough in finding her, but when he gets to his mother's house he makes a heartbreaking discovery, his mother has Huntington's disease. The Christmas spirit is low in Holby City as a woman falls from the roof of her house while trying to cancel Christmas. Iain and Rita flirt by text – but Iain accidentally sends a text meant for Rita to Robyn. Dixie is surprised to learn Jess has filed a complaint against her. She is encouraged to apologise to Jess, but instead decides she is going to help Jess and Olivia escape Nikki. Dylan and Lofty spend Christmas together on Dylan's boathouse, and Jacob spends Christmas with Connie.
| 978 | 17 | "A Life Less Ordinary" | Steve Brett | Barbara Machin | 2 January 2016 | 6.19 |
Cal treats an elderly same-sex couple, Evelyn and Hester, who are struggling to come to terms with the recent discovery that Evelyn needs life-saving surgery immediately. Despite this, the couple flee the hospital. Connie blames Cal for allowing them to go. After work, Cal goes to a nightclub where he meets a girl. The next morning her angry husband locks her in the boot of his car and escapes, with Cal following closely behind. However the cars lose control and fly across the road. As one of the cars fly across the road they hit Evelyn and Hester's car. Cal manages to save all the lives but aware he may still be over the limit Connie stands in and covers for him. Evelyn later dies before she manages to get surgery and Cal breaks the news to Hester. Just hours later, Hester dies from a broken heart. Despite the day's dramatic events, Cal still refuses to tell Ethan of his two recent life-changing discoveries.
| 979 | 18 | "Lie to Me" | Jamie Annett | Kim Millar | 9 January 2016 | 6.38 |
Nikki and Jess are back at home, celebrating Olivia's birthday. They plan a dress-up day, but Jess introduces Olivia to a brand new phone which the couple agreed not to buy for her. This frustrates Nikki and she cuts her finger. Jess goes to dress Nikki's cut but is pushed into a glass cabinet. Olivia witnesses the incident and calls for an ambulance. Dixie and Iain arrive at the house and Dixie realises this was another act of domestic abuse. At the hospital, Nikki reluctantly leaves Jess and Olivia to be treated, and as she does truths come to light about how Nikki abused Olivia as well. When Nikki discovers Jess and Olivia have fled the ED with Dixie, she leaves the hospital to get revenge. Back at the house Nikki tries to celebrate Olivia's birthday but ends up throwing the cake with a sparkler at the wall, starting a fire. Dixie escapes with Jess and Olivia but a curtain which has caught fire falls on Nikki, severely burning her. Dixie runs back in and rescues her. After the day's events Jess breaks up with Nikki and apologises to Dixie. Ethan is distraught upon failing to notice signs that Olivia was being abused. Cal treats a pregnant woman with cancer and helps her tell her husband the truth. Lofty ruins his chances of getting a promotion.
| 980 | 19 | "Black Alert" | David Beauchamp | Matthew Barry | 16 January 2016 | 5.94 |
Lofty's Band Six Nursing interview is cut short when the Emergency Department is placed under a black alert along with St. James due to an overwhelming number of patients. Ethan is forced to discharge a suicidal man to create space for the incoming patients, but the man accidentally causes a car crash resulting in a young couple's car being shunted under a truck. Iain and Dixie arrive at the scene where they meet Jess again. The trio work together to save the couple before the truck explodes. Back at the ED Ethan attempts to accommodate an octogenarian who just hours away from dying. Lofty and Louise try to calm a furious patient, but Lofty feels the wrath as he is pushed through a pane of glass. He later opens up a field hospital outside the ED to help ease the pressure, before receiving the good news he has the job. At the ambulance bay, Dixie and Jess share a kiss, but Dixie listens to her instincts and backs down. Cal reaches his breaking point and prepares to come clean to Ethan.
| 981 | 20 | "Shame" | David Beauchamp | Asher Pirie | 23 January 2016 | 6.19 |
Noel and Big Mac walk home from work together through the park – but while Big Mac is in the toilets Noel is mugged. After realising he isn't strong enough to fight off the mugger, Noel shouts for Big Mac, who hides in the toilet as Noel is beaten across the stomach with a plank of wood. On the way to the ED, Noel is told by Dixie that it was Big Mac who fought off the mugger. The mugger soon arrives at the ED and Mac uncovers her name, Mercedes Christie. Mercedes blackmails Big Mac, and when Noel suffers a collapsed collarbone, he pays Mercedes and warns her to leave. Murray, an office work prankster tricks Claire into thinking she has won £100,000. She quits her job, but trips and falls into a cabinet which collapses on her as she goes to leave. Once in hospital, she soon learns that Murray faked the scratchcard and gets her own justice back on him. Max and Zoe work briefly together to sort a woman Max had a one-night stand with. Dixie receives a letter about her disciplinary hearing. Ethan struggles to come to terms with last week's events, and at a mortality meeting raises his concerns.
| 982 | 21 | "The Good Life" | Jo Johnson | Patrick Homes | 30 January 2016 | 6.13 |
Dixie prepares herself for her disciplinary hearing, and is surprised when Jess arrives at the ambulance bay and explains that she plans on telling the board that it was her fault a child was at risk and that she's planning on speaking on Dixie's behalf at the hearing. Jess then drops a bombshell on Dixie when she tells her that she is moving to Cornwall with Olivia after the hearing. With Dixie's feelings for Jess still strong, she is forced to choose between her heart and her head. Dixie is then caught up in a farmyard accident as a man is struck across the chest with a flying piece of wood and his father is struck with a circular saw. Dixie's day becomes even harder when she has to break the news to the father that his wife has died peacefully in their home. She then takes her disciplinary hearing and learns that she has been given a written warning. After a difficult day, Dixie arrives at Jess's house and tells her she's handed in her resignation and that she wants to move down to Cornwall with her and Olivia. They then pack their bags and Dixie says her goodbyes to all at Holby City, as they wave her off wishing her the best. Ethan hands in his resignation at the same time and vows to see the back of the hospital, but with persuasion from Connie and Lily, he realises his potential and stays in the hospital. Connie is full of guilt as she missed Jacob's birthday, and so makes it up to him by agreeing to stay at his house.
| 983 | 22 | "Step Right Up" | Jo Johnson | Robert Butler | 6 February 2016 | 6.33 |
Ethan throws himself back into work having decided to remain at the hospital, and he works alongside Lily when an autistic teenage girl and her grandfather are admitted after an accident on a fairground ride. Cal is stunned when Emilie is admitted to the ED after a domestic accident at home, and as he desperately attempts to conceal his secret from Ethan that their biological mother is in cubicles – the truth is eventually told and Ethan is left speechless. Following Dixie's departure, Rocker is called in as a cover paramedic for the day, but Iain becomes protective when he flirts heavily with Rita. Noel returns to work following his mugging and is determined to get Big Mac the recognition he deserves, and so calls on the media to see if they're interested in his recent event. Lofty begins to feel the pressure as he struggles to act as a friend and a boss to Robyn.
| 984 | 23 | "Hearts and Flowers" | David Innes Edwards | Dominique Moloney | 13 February 2016 | 6.24 |
Connie is shocked to learn Grace is back in the UK with Sam and his girlfriend, Emma, on a cardiothoracics conference. Emma is admitted after complaining of severe abdominal pains, but Sam is not happy she's been admitted to Holby and demands she be taken elsewhere. Jac Naylor soon arrives in the ED after hearing the news Sam has returned, and as Emma's condition worsens, Jac and Connie are forced to operate on Emma in order to save her life. A young lady is admitted after falling from her balcony, and as her ex-husband follows her into the hospital events soon get out of hand. Ethan and Cal's feud reaches breaking point resulting in a violent fight. Zoe and Max share a Valentine's Day kiss, while Big Mac's guilt overwhelms him as he becomes more and more popular since being regarded a hero by the press.
| 985 | 24 | "Just Do It" | David Innes Edwards | Dana Fainaru | 20 February 2016 | 6.17 |
Connie is surprised to learn Sam and Grace are planning to return to the USA at the end of the day and struggles contain her emotions. She treats a depressed father and his daughter when they are admitted after an accident involving a bus, and when a brain scan shows the daughter needs life-saving surgery immediately, Connie is forced to make the father realise he is not ready to look after her yet. As the day draws to a close Connie realises she is not ready to leave Grace. Alongside Jacob, the pair rush to the airport, where she apologises to Grace for letting her go. Mercedes returns to the hospital after she is involved in a drugs bust-up. PC Wilkinson makes connections between Mercedes and Big Mac and discovers Mercedes was Noel's mugger. This news soon gets out with Noel turning against Mac after learning of Mac's deception before declaring that he is moving out.
| 986 | 25 | "Fatal Error – Part One" | Steve Brett | Matt Cooke, Vincent Lund & Mark Catley | 27 February 2016 | 5.99 |
Lofty decides it is time to step up to the plate and take charge during a hectic shift in the Emergency Department. Zoe treats a young adult male who has been impaled in the chest with the wing of a toy aeroplane and at the same time she manages to reunite the male with his younger brother who has ADHD. As the number of patients being admitted intensifies, the team ask for an agency nurse to help cover the day – Diana Stuart. A homeless couple are admitted after staging a mugging. Dylan discovers the girl is in need of immediate medical attention, but the first almost fatal error occurs when Diana inserts a line of potassium instead of saline. Furious, Dylan demands Lofty puts her straight. Lofty gives her a second chance – but then as Dylan, Lofty and Diana take the young girl up for surgery in the lift, she flatlines, and as Lofty delivers a defibrillator shock, Diana leaves her hand on the patient, also receiving a shock. Diana dies and Lofty can't help but blame himself. Dylan assures Lofty that it was just an accident, but warns Lofty to be careful what he says at his interview.
| 987 | 26 | "Fatal Error – Part Two" | Steve Brett | Emily Groves | 5 March 2016 | 6.32 |
Lofty struggles to come to terms with the day's events in the aftermath of the Diana incident, and as Rita, Connie and Hanssen prepare to begin a formal investigation, it is down to Dylan to set his mind straight. As Rita interviews Lofty, he reassures her he commanded both Dylan and Diana to stay clear upon delivering the defibrillator shock, but when Mr Hall, a deputy health officer for unscheduled incidents, interviews Lofty he changes his statement and explains he does not know if he really commanded Dylan and Diana to stay clear before shocking or not – potentially jeopardising his career at Holby City. Cal and Emilie are admitted after a fall, and as Ethan breaks the news to Cal Emilie has pneumonia and is dying, the pair decide to pull together. Lily and Iain admit a transgender teenager after part of the staging collapses at a gay pride festival, but his best friend struggles to accept change.
| 988 | 27 | "High Tide" | Julie Edwards | Kelly Jones | 12 March 2016 | 5.93 |
Lofty prepares himself for the day of his hearing, but when Lana – Diana's daughter, is admitted intoxicated and struggling to come to terms with her mother's untimely death, he misses his hearing to help her grieve for her mother's loss. He later learns his fate – he is not being fired but he will have to retake his defibrillator assessments. As Rita breaks the news to him, Lofty hands in his resignation and says his goodbyes to the staff at Holby. Jez Andrews, a new paramedic arrives for his first shift. Along with Iain he takes Cal, Ethan and Emilie to a hospice. On their way, Cal asks if they can stop by the roadside for a moment, and hijacks the ambulance, leaving Jez and Iain by the side of the road. Ethan and Cal travel down to the seaside, and as events take a turn for the worse Ethan breaks the news to Cal that Emilie has less than a day to live. At the seaside, Cal shocks Ethan as he presents him with the Huntington Disease test results. It is there Emilie passes away, before Ethan reveals some more devastating news; he has the Huntington's disease gene.
| 989 | 28 | "Sweet Child of Mine" | Julie Edwards | Mark Stevenson | 26 March 2016 | 5.51 |
Connie alerts the team when a high-risk prisoner is admitted the ED after being beaten up. At the same time a female prison officer, Paula, arrives at the department – and it later becomes evident she is his lover. Paula receives a bag of cash and a needle containing HIV infected blood. Connie discovers he has a needle abscess and that it needs immediate treatment. After Connie treats him the pair prepare to escape, but Connie walks in on them and is taken hostage. She is taken down to the basement where events escalate and Jacob finds himself embroiled in the situation. Connie and Jacob are tied to a gas pipe, but when Paula discovers her ill daughter has been admitted as well she aborts their plan to escape. The prisoner prepares to flee, however his abscess bursts and Connie and Jacob are unable to free themselves in time to treat him. He dies. Connie finds herself seeking comfort in Jacob, but Grace walks in on the pair as they kiss. Grace is furious and gives Connie an ultimatum – break up with Jacob or lose her again. Noel and Big Mac resolve their differences when they are locked in a store cupboard. Mercedes is admitted again after drug overdosing. Her son, Connor, follows closely behind. Max takes him on for the day. Ethan and Cal's relationship reaches breaking point as Ethan struggles to accept he has the Huntington's disease gene.
| 990 | 29 | "Buried Alive" | David Beauchamp | Matthew Barry | 2 April 2016 | 5.96 |
Jacob is shocked when Connie tells him she cannot be with him and must focus on her relationship with Grace. Upset by their break-up, Jacob asks Rita if he can go out with the paramedics for the day. Rita accepts his offer of going out with the paramedics and he works alongside Iain and Jez to save an ex-soldier trapped under a steel beam. Connie is later called out to the scene and amputates the casualty's arms. Once the casualty is taken to safety, Connie and Jacob go in for a kiss – but part of the building collapses and Jacob and Connie become trapped in the basement. Sand pours into the basement from above. Connie convinces Jacob neither of them will die but she is then hit on the head by falling rubble and knocked unconscious. The pair lie in the basement, trapped under sand; eventually buried alive. Iain and Jez manage to get to the basement wall and break it down. As they do sand pours out and the pair are found, barely conscious. They arrive back at the hospital and Connie realises how much Grace means to her. Robyn bonds with a dying eleven year-old boy. Cal and Ethan go back to the beach where Emilie died. Connor and Max spend another day together at the hospital.
| 991 | 30 | "Hopelessly Addicted" | David Beauchamp | Kayleigh Llewellyn | 9 April 2016 | 6.14 |
Jez and Iain work against time to save two schoolgirls who are stranded on the ledge of a collapsing quarry after taking an unknown drug. Once the girls are admitted to the ED, Jacob learns there is a dodgy batch of pills being distributed around Holby. He works together with one of the girls to uncover what is really going on. Connie avoids Jacob for the day. Jacob cannot help but tell her how he feels. Connor falls into a bin and calls upon Max to help him. Mercedes mistakes him for a paedophile, but Zoe steps in to break the tension. Ethan attempts to 'be more Cal', and manages to get Lily involved. Big Mac becomes even more dependent on his painkillers, and steals another batch from the medicine tray.
| 992 | 31 | "Survivors" | Lee Haven-Jones | Claire Miller | 16 April 2016 | 5.03 |
Rita is horrified when Mark Ritchie is admitted after he and his eighteen year-old girlfriend, Fiona, are involved in a car crash. Realising that Fiona is the same girl Mark groomed when she was thirteen, Rita's emotions overwhelm her. Lily discovers that Fiona is pregnant, but Fiona has had an ectopic pregnancy. Fiona refuses accept that her child is not going to die. Rita eventually gets through to Fiona and helps her realise she is not truly in love with Mark. When Mark discovers he is single, he loses his temper with Rita. Eight cases of gastroenteritis cause havoc in the ED. Dylan deals with a young woman who he thinks has cyanide poisoning as a result of consuming natural cyanide-containing fruit seed kernels. Zoe reveals to Connie that she wants to broaden her horizons – by leaving Holby City for good, however she asks Connie that she does not tell anyone.
| 993 | 32 | "A Clear Conscience" | Lee Haven-Jones | Joe Williams | 23 April 2016 | 5.13 |
Rita fears for her safety when unusual events occur during her night shift and she receives complaints from non-existent patients at the hospital. Upon returning home she discovers her bedroom has been trashed and her mirror defaced with the words 'you will suffer' in red lipstick. A gas explosion at a construction site results in Cal and Dylan performing a REBOA on a former gangster, but when later complications occur he dies. His best friend struggles to accept his friend's death and a gun hostage situation unfolds outside Resus. Big Mac's drug addiction gets on top of him. Mercedes threatens him and he admits to Noel that he has been stealing tramadol. Noel helps Big Mac by referring him to a narcotics anonymous meeting, but as Big Mac arrives outside the meeting hall, his nerves get the better of him and he flees the meeting. Jack decides medicine is not his speciality and quits his job to pursue a new life in the travel industry.
| 994 | 33 | "Tangled Webs We Weave" | Steve Hughes | Mark Catley | 30 April 2016 | 5.08 |
David Hide, a new nurse, is paired up with Dylan for his first shift at Holby City, and works with him to treat a female alcoholic named Cider Anne, who has cirrhosis of the liver and varicose veins in her abdomen and throat. David does not talk much, and when Anne walks outside the hospital to have a cigarette, a truck reverses and knocks a large concrete block against her, crushing her against a wall. Connie realises the crush injuries are too severe and that Anne is going to die. As the team make Anne comfortable against the wall, they learn two poisonous tarantulas are on the loose. Mark returns to Holby, where Iain threatens him. Connor is abducted by Shelle when Mercedes is beaten up and admitted once again. Max goes on a mission to get Connor to safety, but when Connor falls through a ceiling, Max and Zoe work as a team to save him. Once they return to the ED, Zoe and Max share another kiss.
| 995 | 34 | "Hello, I Must Be Going" | Steve Hughes | Jeff Povey | 7 May 2016 | 5.03 |
Elle Gardner, a new consultant, prepares herself for her first day at Holby City. She is running late and accidentally runs Vince over in the park. She travels with Iain and Jez in the ambulance to the ED. When the trio arrive, Vince flees the hospital to meet Shelle. Elle runs off to find Vince, with Zoe following behind her. They find Vince and Shelle in a pub, but events get out of hand when Vince is slashed across the arm with a knife and smashes his head against a slot machine. Shelle holds Zoe and Elle hostage in the basement of the pub. Max goes searching for Zoe and discovers the hostage situation. Shelle then stabs Zoe in the hand, before Elle pins Shelle against a wall. After the hostage ordeal, Zoe reveals to Dylan she is leaving Holby City and flying out to the USA to start a new career with Nick Jordan (Michael French). Max tells Zoe he is going to the USA with her, but she flees before he is ready to go. Max races to the airport and finds Zoe preparing to leave. In the airport, Max declares his love for Zoe. Zoe tells him it is time to let him go – and the pair share one final kiss, before Zoe walks away from a heartbroken Max.
| 996 | 35 | "Chain Reaction" (Note: See also "Chain Reaction" series 4 & "Chain Reactions" series 11) | Jermain Julien | Jon Sen | 21 May 2016 | 5.44 |
Dylan learns that his father is back at the emergency department with a laceration to the hand after he accidentally locks baby Rihanna in his car and has to break into it. As the pair come face-to-face once again, it is clear the bond between Dylan and Brian is still strained, and as Brian asks for Dylan's forgiveness Dylan refuses to accept. An ailing factory's reactor is tampered with, resulting in a major explosion. When one of the casualties has a broken femur, Jez calls for a doctor. Elle persuades Jacob to let her go out and attend the scene of the accident with him, but without consent, Elle manages to land herself in trouble with Connie. Connie is left jealous when it appears Jacob and Elle have a past together. Big Mac receives a badge from his narcotics anonymous meeting, with Noel supporting him for attending the meetings. David continues to keep quiet, and as Charlie tries to encourage him to become more confident, David only becomes more silent.
| 997 | 36 | "This Life" | Jermain Julien | Kim Millar | 28 May 2016 | 4.14 |
Big Mac's painkiller addiction overwhelms him as he steals tramadol from a relative's bag in the hospital. When Charlie learns Big Mac was behind the stealing he threatens to report the incident to Rita. Big Mac realises he has no choice but to accept support from Charlie, and together the pair return to the narcotics anonymous meeting, where Big Mac finally introduces himself. Connie takes the day off work to attend Sports Day at Grace's school. Things begin to get competitive as Connie goes head-to-head with Grace's friend's mother. Robyn encourages David to speak up as they work together on a patient who believes that she has lung cancer. When their patient discovers that she is not dying, the pair become inspired as they learn she runs a mortality café, which encourages Robyn to set up a mortality café in the ED. Max continues to struggle without Zoe.
| 998 | 37 | "The Best Day of My Life" | Julie Edwards | Ben Ayrton & Jeff Povey | 4 June 2016 | 4.95 |
Hanssen tells Connie that a dissatisfied patient has taken a missing drugs case at the hospital to the press. Determined to not let the newspapers destroy the ED's reputation, Hanssen asks Connie to find out who's been stealing the drugs. Connie ignores Hanssen's request, whereas Elle turns detective to discover who is really stealing the missing drugs. Elle is shocked when Charlie leaves his locker unlocked and she discovers missing tramadol in it. She reports him to Rita and Connie, who warn her not to tell anyone. As Hanssen leaves the hospital, Elle tells him Charlie stole the drugs – which leads to Charlie being suspended. Big Mac allows his guilt to overwhelm him as he watches Charlie walks away from the ED. Ethan finds himself in an awkward situation when a patient he is treating tries to kiss him. Robyn meets a grieving man called Glen at her and David's new Mortality Café meeting.
| 999 | 38 | "You Make Me Sick" | Julie Edwards | John Yorke | 11 June 2016 | 4.54 |
Big Mac continues to keep his drug addiction and stealing a secret from the department. However, when a young girl is admitted to the ED after she is involved in a car crash, she confides in Mac that her step-father has been having sex with her. As Big Mac helps the young girl speak up about her abuse he realises that he needs to come clean to Rita and his colleagues and own up to stealing the patient's medication, and that the culprit was not Charlie. At the confession, Mac decides to hand in his resignation and leave Holby City. Dylan is caught up in a case of mistaken patient identity when two young boys are admitted after being involved in the car crash – but give each other's names. The department ignore Elle following her intervention in suspending Charlie. Jez is caught out stealing food in the Staff Room. Robyn and Glen go on a date during her second Mortality Café meeting, although things don't quite go to plan.
| 1000 | 39 | "History Repeating" | Sean Glynn | Rebecca Wojciechowski | 25 June 2016 | 4.81 |
Elle prepares for a night shift with her colleagues, but they still haven't forgiven her for getting Charlie suspended. When a pregnant lady tries to leave the emergency department with a sore arm, Elle manages to convince her to return to be seen. It is there Elle discovers that her patient has a pulmonary embolism. As Elle attempts to convince her patient to have a scan to determine how bad her emoblism is, she finds herself having to use her power of trust to encourage her patient to have the same scan which resulted in her having a stillbirth last time. She has the scan, but the size of the embolism results in Elle having to perform a caesarian. The baby is born successfully however Elle's patient dies. With support from her colleagues, Elle realises she isn't as alone as she thought she was. Iain calls things off with Rita. Duffy returns to the emergency department as a midwife, and is impressed by Elle's courage and attitude. Hazel admits Rihanna when she has breathing difficulties, and when Brian is also admitted Dylan is less than impressed.
| 1001 | 40 | "What Lies Beneath" | Sean Glynn | Dominique Moloney | 3 July 2016 | 4.62 |
It's the day of Jacob's gun-shot wound policy presentation to the public, but before he is able to leave the ED Connie tells him she is coming with him for moral support. The pair head off together, but when they are caught up in traffic a father begs for their help after the man who got his daughter addicted to heroin becomes stranded in a storm drain. Jacob heads off to rescue the man, but the man is taken away by rapid-flowing water. Then, Jacob is swept off his feet and taken down the storm drain too. The pair find themselves fighting for their lives as they head towards a waterfall. Connie watches on helplessly, and as Jacob and the man edge closer to the waterfall, they fight the water to get to safety. Jacob manages to find a rock to grab hold of, and he manages to save the man too. Jacob and Connie reach the conference centre in time and Jacob gives his presentation. Afterwards they get separate hotel rooms for the night, but Connie and Jacob find themselves falling for each other once again and they share a passionate kiss. Rita hits her eye on a wing-mirror and receives a black eye, but blames it on Mark. When her lies are finally exposed in front of her colleagues, an angry Iain promises to expose her true self to the whole department.
| 1002 | 41 | "Where the Truth Lies" | David Innes Edwards | Henrietta Hardy & Jeff Povey | 9 July 2016 | 5.08 |
As Hazel returns home from a morning walk with Rihanna, Brian is forced to get rid of his cigarette. He goes to throw the cigarette out the window but it rebounds and the floor catches fire. Brian stamps the flames out but they then reignite – whilst Hazel and Rihanna are left alone in the flat. The fire spreads and Hazel shouts for help from the top floor of her flat. She is then thrown forward by an explosion and drops baby Rihanna from the window, where Jez manages to catch her. Dylan learns of what happens, and unaware Brian started the fire, supports his family. When Dylan later discovers Brian's cigarette started the fire he loses his temper again. Brian then comes to a decision and decides to leave Dylan, Hazel and Rihanna for good. David discovers Glen has been lying to Robyn about his dead wife, and exposes his lies in front of her. Charlies catches on to Connie and Jacob restarting their relationship, but Connie tells him to keep it to himself.
| 1003 | 42 | "The Fear" | Louise Hooper | Asher Pirie & Jon Sen | 16 July 2016 | 5.15 |
Rita returns to work but is isolated by her colleagues. When two men are admitted after being impaled on the same spike Rita works with Elle, Louise and Dylan to find a way to free the two men without killing them – but when one of the men pulls themselves off the spike and dies, Rita is left devastated. Connie and Jacob plan on spending the night together until Grace runs away from her Summer camp. Elle is pleased to learn she has a permanent role as a consultant in Holby. Jez and Iain are on the way back to the ED with a young girl until the ambulance runs out of diesel. An infuriated Iain takes his anger out on Jez, but when Iain later tells Jez he will not be reporting the incident Jez tells Iain he is being too harsh on Rita and needs to apologise. Iain apologises to Rita. She gives Iain one final kiss before meeting Charlie outside the pub to tell him she is leaving.
| 1004 | 43 | "Sticks and Stones" | David Innes Edwards | Claire Miller | 30 July 2016 | 5.20 |
When Grace's friend Carmel injures herself on her trampoline, Grace runs home to find Connie and Jacob together. Annoyed at Connie for keeping their relationship a secret, Grace tells Connie she hates her. Alicia returns for a locum shift and works alongside Lily treating Glen. They later discover Glen has stage four brain cancer. In the ED, Connie uncovers self-inflicted injuries on Carmel's stomach, but Grace tells Connie she inflicted the injuries on Carmel. Jacob realises Grace bites her nails and Connie realises Carmel is self-harming. Connie then discovers Carmel is malnourished and starving herself. She overhears Steph telling Carmel she is worthless and hated and Connie informs social service. Steph is furious at Connie, and when Connie and Grace leave the department to go out for the evening, Steph follows them. Steph begins recklessly driving in an attempt to try and talk to Connie and Grace. She overtakes Connie's car but brakes on a bend causing Connie and Grace to drive through a road barrier and plummet off a cliff.

== Reception ==
It was announced on 5 October 2015, that Casualty won the award for Best Drama at the Inside Soap Awards, beating off competitors Waterloo Road and sister show Holby City. Upon winning the award, Kent commented: "Team Casualty was utterly delighted to win the Inside Soap Award last night. Massive thanks to everyone who voted us!". However, on 22 November 2015, Casualty lost out to rival Welsh series Pobol y Cwm which won the Soap round of Radio Times' 2015 TV Champion. Casualty received 33% of votes, while Pobol y Cwm received the remaining 67% of votes.

After Casualty aired their annual Christmas special episode on 19 December 2015, journalist Matt Baylis wrote an article on The Sunday Express explaining that he thought the episode was "a fine seasonal appointment with the Casualty team, let down slightly by the fine detail." Baylis claimed that "Tiny things such as the time of day and the pointlessness of the question matter more than getting all the jargon right." He did praise the show as well, however, saying that despite "going longer than the Nativity" the show "still finds ways to reinvent itself."

On 5 January 2016, it was revealed that Casualty had been shortlisted for the NTA Best Drama Award. However the show lost to rival Downton Abbey. It faced competition from Broadchurch, Doctor Who and Downton Abbey. On 14 February 2016, it was revealed Casualty was the sixth most-loved programme on BBC iPlayer. The programme received more love than popular programmes Great British Bake Off, The Apprentice and even Sherlock. Casualty missed out on being shortlisted at this year's RTS Awards. The show won the Best Soap and Continuing Drama category at last year's awards. Casualty was nominated for TV Soap of the Year at the TRIC Awards 2016, however the show lost to rival EastEnders. Despite this, Casualty did receive the TRIC Special Award in special recognition for its thirtieth year on air in September 2016.

On 21 June 2016, Inside Soap Awards announced longlist nominations for the annual awards ceremony held in October. Amanda Mealing (Connie Beauchamp), Sunetra Sarker (Zoe Hanna), Derek Thompson (Charlie Fairhead) and Richard Windsor (Caleb Knight), were amongst those nominated in the Best Drama Star category, whilst Charlie's near-death experience, Connie & Jacob's romance and Ethan & Cal meeting their mother were amongst those nominated for Best Drama Storyline.
