= Honey Wright =

Fictional character from the BBC medical drama Casualty

- Casualty character
- First appearance: "The Last Call"; 11 October 2014
- Last appearance: "Cradle to Grave"; 19 September 2015
- Portrayed by: Chelsee Healey

In-universe information
- Occupation: Tea lady
- Significant other: Ethan Hardy
- Relatives: Noel Garcia (father)

Honey Wright is a fictional character from the BBC medical drama Casualty, played by Chelsee Healey. She first appears in the series twenty-nine episode "The Last Call", originally broadcast on 11 October 2014. Honey is introduced as the new tea lady in the emergency department (ED) of Holby City Hospital. The character and Healey's casting details were announced in May 2014. Producers approached Healey's agent about a role as a nurse, but she struggled with the medical terminology, so the character of Honey was created instead. The actress was contracted for four months as a semi-regular character and began filming in May 2014. Honey is characterised as a vivacious person who is "fun, bubbly, nice" and caring. Despite being based in the ED's coffee shop, Honey travels around the department with a tea trolley. She has a pink car with big eyelashes attached to the headlamps.

The character's arrival contrasts the sombre mood of the funeral of regular character Jeff Collier (Matt Bardock). Writers created a secret for the character and it emerges that she is the long-lost daughter of established character Noel Garcia (Tony Marshall). Another story for the character involved her second job as a pole dancer. Healey had to pole dance for the scenes, which she initially found embarrassing. Producers paired Honey in a romance with registrar Ethan Hardy (George Rainsford), but the relationship is marred by Ethan's shyness and interference from Noel and Ethan's friend Lily Chao (Crystal Yu). Honey leaves Holby for five months and upon her return, the relationship ends. She departs again in the series thirty episode "Cradle to Grave", originally broadcast on 19 September 2015. The character received a positive response from viewers and critics alike.

== Casting ==
On 19 May 2014, it was announced that actress Chelsee Healey had joined Casualty as tea lady Honey Wright. She began filming during the same week. Oliver Kent, the show's executive producer, expressed his delight at Healey's casting and opined that she would "bring her unique combination of bounce and style" to the role. He added that Honey is "like no other character we've ever featured in Casualty". Erika Hossington, the show's series producer, praised Healey's performance in the role and said that Healey created "a different type of character" with Honey. Healey's agent was approached by the Casualty production team to arrange her casting and discussions took place over multiple months. The role marked the actress' return to acting after 18 months. It was originally planned for Healey to portray a nurse, but she struggled with the medical terminology, so they rewrote the role to make her a tea lady instead. Healey was contracted for a four-month period as a semi-regular character. She hoped this would be extended as she wanted a long-term role. While filming, the actress commuted between her home in Manchester and the show's studios in Cardiff.

== Development ==
=== Characterisation and introduction ===
The character is billed as a tea lady with "big hair and a big personality". Healey called Honey a "very out there" and vivacious person who will speak before thinking. She described her as "a fun, bubbly, nice character" and added that Honey is very caring and has "a really big heart". The actress felt that she could relate to the character's ditziness, which made her portrayal easier. Healey previously portrayed Janeece Bryant on Waterloo Road and felt that the characters were very similar. Honey performs tarot readings to her colleagues and patients and also believes that she can read auras, which Healey admitted is "actually a load of rubbish". Although she is based within the emergency department's (ED) coffee shop, Honey often travels around the ED with a tea trolley. Hossington liked this aspect of the character and compared her to Hayley Pearce in the documentary The Call Centre, saying that she "pops up everywhere".

Honey is introduced in the series twenty-nine episode "The Last Call", originally broadcast on 11 October 2014. The episode also includes the funeral of regular character Jeff Collier (Matt Bardock) and Honey's arrival contrasts the sombre mood of the funeral. Healey told Sean Marland of What's on TV that "Honey bursts in with her bright colours and her big mouth" as her new colleagues are grieving. As a result, she is not widely welcomed and clashes with receptionist Louise Tyler (Azuka Oforka). While travelling for her first shift, Honey finds an injured woman, so she puts her in her car and brings her to the ED. En route, the woman is sick on the passenger seat. The character's car is "candy pink" with big eyelashes attached to the headlamps. Healey cannot drive, so could not drive Honey's car. To avoid viewers realising this, scenes had to be filmed carefully. After passing the woman to the medics, Honey introduces herself to her new colleagues, although she mistakenly says that she is a barrister rather than a barista. Honey starts to realise Jeff's importance in the ED and decides to create a memory board in his honour, although she accidentally calls it a mood board. Healey thought it was a "sweet" gesture that helps her build friendships with her colleagues.

Writers created a secret for Honey upon her introduction, and Hossington confirmed in August 2014 that Honey would feature in a story with established character Noel Garcia (Tony Marshall). When Noel notices that Honey is displaying an interest in him, he explains that he is too old for a relationship with her. Honey then reveals that she is his daughter from a one-night stand when he was younger. Noel is "stunned" by the news and leaves Honey "heartbroken" by walking away from her. The pair struggle to bond, so Honey buys them tickets to a comedy show which they both like.

=== Relationship with Ethan Hardy ===
Producers romantically paired Honey with registrar Ethan Hardy (George Rainsford). Healey performed a screen test with Rainsford during her casting and he tried to make the experience "relaxed" for her. The actors' chemistry was noticed by producers, who then plotted the romance following Honey's introduction. Honey and Ethan have different personalities and do not share many traits, but develop a strong bond. Healey called the pair "total opposites" and said that they "really fancy each other". She described their relationship as "natural", but was unsure about their suitability as a couple. Rainsford explained that Honey views Ethan as "a gentleman who will treat her properly", and Healey noted that "there's something about [Ethan which] Honey's drawn to". Rainsford added that Honey likes Ethan's good nature and their different personalities. The actor observed that Ethan is attracted to Honey and likes how open she is about her feelings. Healey believed that Ethan likes Honey's vulnerability. Rainsford told Elaine Reilly of What's on TV that Ethan and Honey have not been in relationships with people like each other.

Ethan goes to a strip club with his friends, but is surprised to see Honey working as a pole dancer. Healey thought that this exposed a "sexy, dark side" to Honey, which was different from her usual persona. Honey quickly tries to cover herself up in front of Ethan, but when they speak, she pretends to enjoy the work. Healey explained that Honey is only doing the job because "she needs the money". The scenes were filmed during a hot summer day in the basement of a strip club. Rainsford called the day of filming "surreal". Healey felt "mortified" when she learnt she had to pole dance for the scenes, but soon grew comfortable and enjoyed filming the scenes. Despite this, she admitted that "it might have been nicer not to be swinging around a pole half-naked!"

Honey tells Ethan how she feels about him and they nearly share a kiss, but are interrupted by Noel. Following this, Honey is eager to continue the romance while Ethan is apprehensive. Rainsford explained that Ethan is attracted to Honey, but his "shyness and fear of failure" prevent him progressing the relationship further. Registrar Lily Chao (Crystal Yu) notices the developing romance between Honey and Ethan and offers Honey advice with the intention of preventing a relationship. Yu found Lily's response to the romance "interesting" and explained that she does not know to deal with love. She commented, "Time will tell if she's jealous, supportive or even knows how she feels!" Lily makes snide comments about Honey to Ethan, which he dislikes. Rainsford did not believe that his character would suit a love triangle.

=== Departure and return ===
Ethan uses Valentine's Day as an opportunity to tell Honey about his feelings, but struggles due to his self-doubts. As Ethan prepares to tell Honey, she takes a phone call and learns that her grandmother requires immediate care. Rainsford said that Honey makes the "difficult decision" to leave Holby. Honey departs in the series twenty-nine episode "Sweetie", originally broadcast on 14 February 2015. That same month, Healey began filming another stint on the show. Honey returns later in the series, in the episode "The Next Step", originally broadcast on 25 July 2015. Honey and Ethan reconcile their relationship, but face opposition from Noel. He eventually accepts Ethan as part of the family. The couple face problems and consequently decide to end the relationship. The break-up becomes public knowledge and Honey has to confess to her job as a pole dancer, leaving Noel believing he has "let his girl down". Honey tells Noel that she wants to become a beauty therapist, so he offers her a loan to start her own business. This marks Healey's departure from the series and she departs in the series thirty episode "Cradle to Grave", originally broadcast on 19 September 2015.

== Reception ==
Healey received a positive response to the character from the audience and confessed that she had not received any negative comments. Rainsford stated that he received messages supporting Honey and Ethan's relationship as well as messages wondering if the relationship was preventing a relationship between Ethan and Lily Chao. Marland (What's on TV) called Honey a "bonkers barista". His colleague, Reilly, dubbed her the "chirpy tea lady". Holly Wade, writing for the Radio Times, billed Honey as "the happy-go-lucky tea lady of the show", adding that she is "fun and bubbly with a big personality". Ellis (Inside Soap) described her as "bubbly" and thought that Honey did not "pick the best day to make her ED debut".
