= Ethan Hardy =

Fictional character from the BBC medical dramas Casualty and Holby City

- Casualty character
- George Rainsford as Ethan Hardy
- First appearance: "Bad Timing"; 11 January 2014
- Last appearance: "40th Anniversary Part 2"; 5 September 2026
- Portrayed by: George Rainsford
- spinoff(s): On Call (2015); Holby City (2016, 2018, 2021)
- Duration: 2014–2023, 2026

In-universe information
- Occupation: Consultant in emergency medicine; (prev. specialty registrar, clinical lead)
- Family: Emilie Groome (biological mother); Matilda Hardy (adoptive mother); Caleb Knight (brother)
- Significant others: Honey Wright; Alicia Munroe; Leigh-Anne Carr; Effie Laurence; Fenisha Khatri
- Children: Bodhi Khatri (son)

Ethan Hardy is a fictional character from the BBC medical drama Casualty, played by actor George Rainsford. He first appeared in the series twenty-eight episode "Bad Timing", broadcast on 11 January 2014. Rainsford's casting was announced alongside Richard Winsor who had been hired to play Ethan's brother Caleb Knight. The pair were described by the show's executive producer Oliver Kent as completely different characters who would change the dynamic on Casualty. Ethan is a Specialist registrar in emergency medicine and is an excellent medic who had worked hard to achieve his position in the profession. He is characterised as a shy, socially awkward person with a serious and attentive attitude. Throughout his inclusion in the show Ethan has shared an on-screen friendship with like minded Lily Chao (Crystal Yu). He has had romantic stories alongside the character Honey Wright (Chelsee Healey). Writers developed Ethan's relationship with his brother Cal into a sibling rivalry. This has provided both characters with dramatic stories.

The character has played a centric role in a special themed episode titled, "Holby Sin City". In the episode Ethan is depicted trying to solve a murder mystery. In 2015, the show explored a story focusing on Ethan and Cal's family history. The storyline was pitched by Casualty's co-creator Paul Unwin. It features Ethan learning that he is adopted, meeting his biological mother Emilie Groome (Carol Royle) who has Huntington's disease and later discovering he has inherited the disease. Writers created more romance for Ethan with Cal's girlfriend Alicia Munroe (Chelsea Halfpenny), their affair causes a sibling feud. When Winsor departed the show in 2017, Cal was murdered by Scott Ellisson (Will Austin). Writers used the incident to create a story of revenge and unethical behaviour to coincide with Ethan's grief. Ethan's morals were permanently compromised when he allows Scott to die under the hospital's care. Writers continued to portray Ethan as unethical through romance stories with his patients Leigh-Anne Carr (Cassie Bradley) and Effie Laurence (Abigail Hardingham). In 2019, producers gave Rainsford a posttraumatic stress disorder story to portray. Ethan is involved in an explosion which kills a colleague. Survivor's guilt and stress lead Ethan into yet more unethical behaviour.

Other stories include Ethan being involved in a mini-bus crash, being promoted to clinical lead and becoming disillusioned with the NHS system for over-working staff. He developed a romance with paramedic Fenisha Khatri (Olivia D'Lima), who gave birth to their son Bodhi. Ethan's response to grief was explored again when Fenisha died on their wedding day and Ethan struggled with whether to care for Bodhi or leave him with Fenisha's parents.

For his portrayal of Ethan, Rainsford won "Best Drama Star" at the 2017 Inside Soap awards. Ethan has generally been well received by critics of the genre. In 2020, Emma Bullimore from the Radio Times stated that Ethan had become one of the show's best characters from the show's entire duration; Robert Hiley from What's on TV branded Ethan a "brilliant character".

In November 2022, it was confirmed that Ethan Hardy would be leaving Casualty, with actor Rainsford leaving the role after nine years on the program. Ethan departed on 4 February 2023 in the episode "Fight or Flight". In 2026, Rainsford reprised his role for the show's 40th anniversary special.

== Casting ==
The character and Rainsford's casting were announced on 4 September 2013. Richard Winsor was cast to play Ethan's brother Caleb Knight who would also secure employment at Holby City hospital. The audition process was extremely thorough and careful as the show were looking for the right actors to play two brothers who have a testing but loving relationship. The actor auditioned for the role in London and impressed casting directors. Rainsford and Winsor then had a screen test audition together to check their suitability for the sibling relationship Casualty wanted to portray. They were in full costume and make-up acting out scenes. Rainsford believed they shared on-screen chemistry straight away. Rainsford began filming on 2 September 2013.

The BBC described Ethan as a "studious witty whizz kid" in comparison to the "pure adrenaline junkie" Cal. The characters were introduced with the intention of having a "big impact" on the emergency department featured in the show. Casualty's executive producer Oliver Kent stated "The arrival of Ethan and Caleb will instantly change the dynamic of the ED. Whilst very different characters, one thing they will have in common is an ability to charm, so expect sparks to fly." The actor found the most daunting thing about joining Casualty to be the style of filming. He recalled a "terrifying" moment he had to deliver the final lines of a fast-paced scene as part of his first episode.

Rainsford's exit from Casualty had been heavily speculated for a while before officially being confirmed in an interview with executive producer, Jon Sen, who confirmed that Rainsford had exited Casualty after nine years. However, it was confirmed that Rainsford may return to the show, with Sen confirming that it wasn't a permanent exit for Rainsford.

== Development ==
=== Characterisation and sibling rivalry ===
It is with great attention to detail and a cheeky grin that Ethan treats his patients. He is always there when you need him, equipped with a sympathetic witty comment and a coy sparkle in his eye. Ethan is easy to laugh with and relies on his natural charm to avoid any confrontation. Although Ethan charms many, he fails when it comes to women - a flaw made all the more apparent next to his smooth-talking fast-moving brother, Cal.

— BBC Online.

Ethan is characterised as a doctor with excellence, extremely attentive, very academic but relatively shy. He also has a humorous side to his personality and is prone to making witty comments. In stressful situations Ethan is likely to make jokes. Rainsford has summed the character up as "serious, focused and cautious". Rainsford believes that finding a love interest for the character would be "a slow process" due to his awkward persona. He had to study a lot to pass medical school. This has made him a "very good and hard-working doctor" who is gentle towards his patients and "very thorough". Rainsford told Daniel Kilkelly from Digital Spy that Ethan's "methodical nature" in medicine means that he sometimes overlooks the human aspect of cases.

A writer from BBC Online states that whilst the character "thrives as a doctor" but has often lived his life in the shadow of his brother and fellow specialist registrar Cal. He has provided Ethan with a "lifetime of frustration" and Ethan is always there to sort out Cal's problems. Ethan and Cal share a "complicated family history". They have different personalities with Ethan being the more reserved brother. But Rainsford said that as Ethan's stories played out viewers could see that the character struggled with making connections with colleagues unlike his brother. In addition there is much conflict between the two due to their differences. They also go through dramas because of their family history. But Rainsford believed there was also caring moments for the siblings, adding "I think at heart there's a brotherly love there." The show remained committed to developing their brotherly relationship and repairing it. They move in together to see how they cope living together. Rainsford concluded that there will always be stories that test the relationship but after one year on-screen the two were "getting along much better". In one storyline Ethan is caught up in a mini-bus crash which he survives. Cal is tasked to perform life-saving surgery to save his brother's life.

Rainsford told David Brown (Radio Times) that "he's serious and hardworking, but he's also somewhat awkward socially. He has this methodical, cautious approach, but he does end up making slightly inappropriate jokes and using self-deprecating humour." Ethan forms a friendship with CT2 Lily Chao (Crystal Yu) and they are quite alike. Rainsford assessed that the two characters relate to each other because of their social difficulties. Ethan views Lily as someone who is similar to himself and as episodes play out the pair develop a bond.

=== "Holby Sin City" ===
Ben Dowell from the Radio Times announced that Casualty were planning three special stand-alone episodes with dark themes. The episode titled "Holby Sin City" was one of these episodes and focused on Ethan as the centric character. The episode features a murder mystery which Ethan takes it upon himself to solve. Rainsford told Sarah Ellis from Inside Soap that the episode is stylised as a "crime thriller" with a "film noir" narrative. It features a different look to normal episodes, darker lighting and "eerie and mysterious-looking" locations. The actor was excited about the episode after writers gave him the scripts. He believed that filming and producing the episode was challenging for all involved. Shooting scenes had to be done fast and a large crane with a rain machine was used to add to the dark theme.

On-screen when a patient Clyde Jackson (Stuart Manning), dies because medics cannot resuscitate due to a DNR order, Ethan becomes suspicious and believes there is something sinister behind it. Another guest character in the episode, Bonnie Curtis (Renee Castle) who was billed as a "femme fatale" catches Ethan's attention as a suspect. A series of flashback sequences play out which reveal that Ethan has treated Bonnie before and they have formed a friendship. It transpires that Bonnie has been the victim of domestic violence and Ethan is her confidant. He believes this could be a motive to kill her violent partner. Interviewed by Victoria Wilson of What's on TV, Rainsford said that Ethan is "quite gushing" about Bonnie and she "makes him act quite differently in that he almost loses himself in this woman, rather publicly in the hospital."

Bonnie realises that Ethan is suspicious of her and wants to get rid of him. Bonnie tells hospital CEO Henrik Hanssen (Guy Henry) that she and Ethan are in a relationship to get him removed from Clyde's case. Rainsford explained that Bonnie had been using Ethan and then drugs him to prevent him from interfering. But "Ethan is a very moral guy, and he wants to make sure justice is done. So he battles the effects of the drug and marches down the police station, wearing a fedora!" The actor told Elaine Reilly from What's on TV that the story helped shape his character into the next phase of development. He added that following Bonnie's deception he develops a mistrust of women; admitting he was eager to explore more relationship stories rather than medical ones.

=== Relationship with Honey Wright ===
The show's producers created a romance story for Ethan and barista Honey Wright (Chelsee Healey). The two are an unlikely couple who appear incompatible but get along well together and share a connection. It is a case of "opposites attract". Healey explained that "they have a natural relationship. Ethan likes her vulnerable side and there's something about him Honey's drawn to too." But Healey was unsure if the two characters would "make a good couple". Ethan goes to a strip club on a night out and is shocked to find Honey working as a pole dancer. Healey told Reilly that her character tries to cover up and pretends to Ethan that she enjoys her job. But in reality Honey is only working there to generate income.

Honey tells Ethan that she likes him but he fails to respond. Rainsford said that his on-screen counterpart's "shyness and fear of failure" let him down. He cannot tell her how he feels despite wanting to. He added that Ethan is genuinely attracted to Honey because she is open about her feelings unlike women he had previously met. Honey has been let down by men in her past. The actor believed she views Ethan as a gentleman who will treat her with respect. He added "the basis of their attraction is that they're very different, but he's got a good soul and I think that appeals to her." Ethan decides to use Valentine's Day as an opportunity to tell Honey how he feels. But when he tries she receives a telephone call and Honey has to leave to look after her ill grandmother. After time away, Honey returns to Holby and begins a relationship with Ethan. Honey's father Noel Garcia (Tony Marshall) starts to accept Ethan as a potential future son-in-law. But the pair face problems and both come to the conclusion that their relationship is not working and decide to move on.

=== Work struggles and friendship with Lily Chao ===
"I've played Lily for almost three years now and seen her and Ethan develop so much. Once upon a time she would have liked to be with him, as he understands her, but now she'd rather they were great friends."

— Crystal Yu (who plays Lily) on her friendship with Ethan.

Ethan begins to struggle with his work schedule and when a patient is left undiagnosed he decides to resign. He then discovers the patient has been the victim of domestic violence and he was too busy to realise. Rainsford told Reilly that his character is "mortified" he failed to notice signs of domestic abuse. He explained that Ethan is "normally such a meticulous, caring doctor" but he was just too busy. The character feels that guilty; he tries to take on more work despite being so worn out. When a patient arrives at the department with a sprained ankle during a busy shift, Ethan loses his temper. His colleagues step in to defuse the angry situation to prevent him ruining his career. Ethan also has to deal with two upsetting medical cases: One of which Rainsford said it more difficult for his character because he does not have enough time to even help him properly.

Ethan then looks for jobs vacancies in Australia. His friend Lily tries to convince him to stay. Yu told Reilly that Ethan is "overworked and overtired". He blames himself and the hospital for failing patients. He is a "good doctor" who would like to remain at the hospital. The actress added that Ethan has been let down by the system. Lily believes giving up his job would be unproductive in their aims to improve NHS services. As a close friend, Lily is not afraid to be honest and accuses him of running from his problems. Lily then approaches Connie to help her convince Ethan to stay as his departure would effect the emergency department. Ethan later decides to move on from his dissatisfaction with NHS restrictions and remain at the hospital.

Yu added that there was also "an element of selfishness" from her character because Ethan is Lily's only friend and she wants him to remain. But there were no longer romantic intentions for Lily as they had gone "beyond romance" and formed a "solid" friendship. She would prefer him to be a lifelong friend rather than risk losing him to a failed romance. When Yu first joined the show she was made to believe that Lily and Ethan would start a relationship, but this never materialised. Producers felt that they did not have romantic chemistry because of the actor's off-set hysterics. In one storyline Lily bullies her junior colleague Alicia Munroe (Chelsea Halfpenny). Ethan expresses his anger about her treatment of Alicia. But Yu stated that Ethan can understand the situation Lily was placed in and why she bullied Alicia. She is also the type of character who feels she does not need to explain herself and Yu believed Ethan equates to that feeling and knows Lily well.

=== Adoption and Huntington's disease ===
Casualty producer Erika Hossington lined up a new family related storyline for the character which played out towards the end of 2015. She told Daniel Kilkelly from Digital Spy that "we've been planning this for a year - it's a very in-depth story and it will strike at the heart of their sibling relationship." Casualty's co-creator Paul Unwin pitched the storyline and the production team "loved" the idea. The plot formed Casualty's "big Christmas storyline".

It came at a time Ethan and Cal had repaired their relationship. Cal had stolen Ethan's fifteen-thousand pound inheritance and gave it to his girlfriend Taylor Ashbie (Sarah Jayne Dunn), who turned out to be a con-artist. But Taylor returns with a daughter, Matilda and she claims the baby is Cal's. Winsor said the story is "massive" and affects both brothers "hugely" as they adjust to looking after a baby. He said it provides both "funny and touching" moments alongside "twists and turns that are going to challenge them in dramatic ways." The actor was also pleased with "real gift" that Ethan and Cal had united following their clashes over Taylor.

When Matilda falls ill he has to take a blood test check compatibility. It turns out Matilda is not actually Cal's daughter. Cal later finds inconsistencies between his blood group and his late mother's, which means she was not his biological mother. Winsor told Reilly (What's on TV) that Cal cannot believe he was adopted but the "most devastating part" is the worry he may not be blood-related to Ethan. Cal decides to keep his discovery a secret from Ethan. Winsor defended his character's dishonesty because he does not know how best to tell Ethan, adding "the longer he leaves it, the worse it gets." Cal decides to track down his biological mother with the aim of collecting maximum information about his adoption and Ethan's maternity. Winsor stated "Cal wants to find out if Ethan is his true brother, because they have an important bond." The actor later reflected on the storyline, stating "This story has a real domino affect [sic!], from Taylor, the baby, and now to this revelation about the adoption, and the question ‘are Ethan and Cal brothers?’ It's beautifully constructed and there's a lot more to come!"

Producer Oliver Kent later announced that Ethan would discover the adoption secret. He opined that the focus had been on Cal, but it was Ethan's turn "to take centre stage" with "fairly major" ramifications. Ethan discovers that Cal has been lying to him and he is adopted. Ethan is shocked to learn Emilie Groome (Carol Royle) is his mother and that she is suffering from Huntington's disease which he may have inherited. When Emilie injures herself and Cal dislocates her shoulder looking after her, Ethan is forced to treat her. Ethan has to remain emotionally distant as he treats Emilie. She develops complications from pneumonia and fears she will die in hospital. She makes it clear she wants to die at home but Ethan and Cal argue over Emilie. Her condition deteriorates and they are forced to work together to provide a solution for their dying mother. Ethan and Cal steal an ambulance and take Emilie to the seaside where she can die in peace with them by her side. Ethan and Cal also receive results which reveal which of them is suffering from Huntington's disease.

The Huntington's disease storyline was researched very thoroughly. The show worked alongside Huntington's Disease Association for advice and support to create the storyline. Royle also carried out much private research including meeting with sufferers. Casualty's researcher Ross Southard said "It has been an extremely rewarding and important storyline for us. We really hope that Emilie's story and subsequently Cal and Ethan's story will help to highlight and raise awareness of HD and continue to help those affected by the disease."

=== Relationship with Alicia Munroe ===
Producers created a new romance story for Ethan and F2 doctor Alicia Munroe. In July 2016, Winsor told Metro's Duncan Lindsay that Ethan and Cal would "end up competing" and "sparring" for the attention of the same female. Writers teased romance for Ethan and Alicia when they both become trapped in a woodland sinkhole, while rescuing a patient. Before they are rescued, Alicia has a panic attack and Ethan comforts her, resulting in Alicia trying to kiss him. Rainsford explained that Ethan is scared of telling Alicia about his Huntington's disease diagnosis. Ethan "really likes Alicia", but his fear becomes a mental blockade preventing him from beginning a relationship with her. Lindsay revealed that Cal would develop feelings for Alicia too. A storyline later trailer confirmed that the three characters would become involved in a "love triangle" plot. Casualty's series producer, Erika Hossington told Sophie Dainty (Digital Spy) that the story would be a long-running one. She added that the main focus would be on Alicia and her turmoil being involved with two brothers. Alicia developed a distrust of men after her parents broke up. Hossington explained that when Alicia met Ethan, he was "the most perfect man she could ever meet".

Writers decided to firstly pair Alicia with Cal and Halfpenny explained that Alicia wanted to be comforted by his "kindred spirit". Despite this, she acknowledged that Alicia was vulnerable and knew she made the wrong decision. Ethan tries to date Penny Levitt (Louisa Connolly-Burnham), but she notices that Ethan seems more interested in Alicia. This prompts Ethan to confess his feelings for Alicia. Ethan has sex with Alicia but she tries to pretend it never happened. Alicia faces a further dilemma when she tries to end her relationship with Cal to be with Ethan. Alicia is loath to destroy the relationship between the two brothers and decides she cannot bare to tell Cal the truth. Halfpenny told Sarah Ellis of Inside Soap that Alicia did have feelings for Cal too, so she takes the "easy option" and stays with him. She thinks that choosing Ethan would "open a huge can of worms". Halfpenny believed that Alicia knew Ethan was the best option for her because of the character's reputation. Halfpenny stated that the majority of viewers wanted her to be with Ethan; though viewers on social networking website Twitter expressed their worries that Alicia was ruining the brother's relationship.

Halfpenny said that Alicia was not "expecting to get caught"; Cal finds Ethan's cuff-link in Alicia's bedroom and realises her betrayal. Cal decides to keep his discovery a secret and Alicia carries on lying comfortably unaware of Cal's paranoia. Halfpenny believed her character was in denial and does not suspect that Cal is paranoid because it is not something he usually feels. Alicia's behaviour even makes Cal feel unusually insecure, which Halfpenny thought was "fun to watch him squirm on screen for once." Cal finds Alicia's second phone in her locker and believes she leading a double life. Halfpenny commented that "All Cal's fears are confirmed in that moment. He reacts as any red-blooded male would do and lashes out!" She added that Ethan is the "last person" who Cal would suspect and he would be "completely surprised and massively hurt" by the revelation. Cal eventually discovers the truth. Ethan later asks Cal for his blessing to pursue a relationship with Alicia. While they are on their date, Cal is murdered, leaving Ethan devastated. Rainsford stated, "it's typical that after a year of ups and downs and procrastinating, they got together on the day that Cal is murdered". In the aftermath of his death, Alicia and Ethan grow closer. The pair eventually break-up because of Ethan's grief. In September 2017, producer Lucy Raffety branded Ethan and Alicia's relationship "the lovely, glowy heart of the show" and expressed hope that her team could reunite them in the future. Writers briefly reunited the two characters and even featured a marriage proposal. The story coincided with Halfpenny's departure from the series. She turns down the proposal and decides to take a job elsewhere.

=== Cal's murder and revenge ===
"Ethan's in shock about what happened [...] It destorys [sic?] Ethan to find out Cal was clearly protecting him, he feels guilt and anger. It should have been him who died but, instead, he was courting Alicia in the pub. He's distraught."

— Rainsford describes Ethan's reaction to Cal's murder.

Cal is murdered by Scott Ellisson (Will Austin) in a knife attack. Rainsford told Ellis (Inside Soap) that Ethan is in "shock" and feels "numb" in the aftermath of Cal's murder. Ethan listens to a voicemail message from Cal, which reveals that Scott originally intended to kill him. This leaves Ethan feeling responsible for his brother's demise. Rainsford described his character as "mortified" and he develops "guilt and anger". In addition he is upset that he betrayed his brother with Alicia and Cal gave his blessing for them to get together. Ethan decides to hand the voicemail over to the police. He trusts that they will bring Scott to justice. The character has "a very strong moral compass" and he naturally seeks justice for Cal. The police fail to resolve his murder quickly, which leaves Ethan feeling vengeful. Writers used the story to explore a different side to Ethan's persona. Rainsford commented that viewers "see his morals challenged and it all gets darker quite quickly."

Prior to Cal's funeral, Ethan gets drunk as he cannot fathom the circumstances of his brother's death. Rainsford explained that Ethan gets into an "emotional state" over the unanswered questions. Then he decides to seek out more information and steals his brother's post-mortem report, which reveals that Cal was conscious prior to death. Consultant Dylan Keogh (William Beck), who attempted to save Cal, confirms his awareness and suffering prior to his death. Rainsford stated that this made Ethan become "bitter" that Scott is getting away with murder. He goes on a "downward spiral", begins drinking and turns up at his brother's funeral. Rainsford found Ethan's grief story difficult because the scripts were so "heavy and emotional". He often had to find time alone to regain his concentration and focus on the story. He added that he was "genuinely sad" to say good-bye to the character that had been "a huge part of my Casualty experience."

When Scott's brother Mickey Ellisson (Mitch Hewer) is admitted to hospital, Ethan tries to blackmail Scott. He tells Scott that he will only save Mickey's life if he confesses to Cal's murder. Rainsdford defended the character's unethical actions because he was just "distraught" in his quest for justice. Scott later visits his Mickey in hospital. A Casualty publicist told Inside Soap's Ellis that everyone in the emergency department knows Scott killed Cal. They added that Ethan "can't stand by and watch Scott terrorise more people." Ethan is angry that Scott is at the hospital and tells him that Mickey has been having sex with paramedic Jez Andrews (Lloyd Everitt). He reacts angrily and a fight between Mickey, Jez and Scott breaks out and the latter is sent plummeting over a high balcony. Scott has severe injuries and begs Ethan to help him. Rainsford commented that it was the first time Scott was vulnerable. He is "genuinely scared" and needs Ethan to save him. He added that "moral" Ethan goes into "doctor mode" and issues Scott medical care. Ethan is soon taken off Scott's treatment team and ordered to stay away. Ethan later visits Scott and is met with further denial over Cal's death. Scott regains his usual "antagonistic attitude", which angers Ethan at the same time medical assistance is needed once again. Rainsford said that Ethan has a choice of saving Scott and a choice "he will have to live with."

Ethan does not intervene when a medical response is needed and Scott dies from his injuries. At the inquest into Scott's death, Ethan is cleared of any involvement. Rainsford told Allison Jones of Inside Soap that "the guilt is eating away" at his character. He tries to convince himself that "nature took its course" and Scott would have died anyway. He is "relieved" when the inquest clears him of any wrong-doing, but the guilt soon resurfaces. He struggles to diagnose illnesses and even falls asleep on the job. He also has dreams about Scott which leave him feeling like a murderer. Rainsford commented that the usual "moral, good person" Ethan is conflicted as he crossed over to "the dark side". He cannot escape his guilt and subsequently Ethan does not "know who he is anymore". Rainsford concluded that Ethan is left wanting closure to rid of the feeling of impending doom.

Writers continued to play on Ethan's mounting guilt. He writes a letter of resignation and hands it to clinical lead Connie Beauchamp (Amanda Mealing). Rainsford believed at this point Ethan could no longer carry the burden of his secret, he "doubts himself and is making mistakes." Producers took the story in a new direction, with Connie keeping Ethan's secret as leverage to blackmail him. Connie is diagnosed with cancer and asks for Ethan's help to perform an operation to remove a blood clot from her arm. Rainsford explained Ethan's "shock" over his boss' unethical behaviour. He is initially adamant that he cannot help because has already "dabbled with questionable morals these past few months." Connie tells Ethan that she will expose the truth about Scott's death unless he helps her. Ethan still wants to rid of the guilt but is left conflicted because he was enjoying his new friendship with Connie. Mealing described Ethan and Connie's friendship as "unlikely" and it soon becomes a "private and co-dependant" dynamic. She added it was "the beginning of an intriguing new chapter" for two characters. Rainsford told Ellis that he was "intrigued" when he learned of Ethan and Connie's partnership. He described their dynamic as "interesting" because they could be friends but they enjoy having conflict between them. He said portraying their conflicts was a "fun" experience.

=== Clinical lead role ===
The producers of Casualty continued to invest in Ethan's career development the show's 2018 run. Ethan passes his exams and becomes a qualified consultant. Then they elevated his status to the acting clinical lead of the emergency department. The actor told Inside Soap's Ellis that Ethan is "not up to the job" and doesn't get any better. On Ethan's suitability for the role Rainsford quipped, "he's previously done one shift as clinical lead, and in the world of Casualty that's as good a qualification than any!" The story developed after Connie took a leave of absence following her cancer ordeal. Dylan briefly takes over her role but decides to resign from the role. Ethan arrives at the hospital in a new suited attire and announces that he is now clinical lead. In the scenes, Ethan's colleagues are left "underwhelmed" by the announcement because of Ethan's previous attempts at running the department. Those placed in the role of clinical lead are required to feature in more scenes. The clinical lead will be involved in overseeing the department and involved in all medical stories. Rainsford stated that he was suddenly constantly in the studios filming more scenes than he had ever done before. He found it "hard" being in almost "every single scene". Rainsford also professed his admiration for Mealing, who constantly had that work load in the role of Connie.

The storyline was portrayed as a new beginning for the character, following months of turmoil. Rainsford told What's on TV's Reilly that Ethan starts his new role "chipper" but there is "a lot of pressure on him and he quickly realises he can't keep everyone happy." Aside from the "pressure from the management", Ethan has to contend with Connie's opinion. Rainsford revealed that Ethan receives "a very Connie-esque blessing" where she tells him he will do a terrible job of clinical lead. Ethan also becomes a mentor for Bea Kinsella (Michelle Fox), which Rainsford thought was "nice" that his character was "looking after somebody". His first challenge as clinical lead is pulling rank on Dylan, who is better qualified than Ethan. When he discovers that Dylan has a drink problem, he finds it difficult to reprimand him. Rainsford said "Ethan really cares about people" and does not want anyone to know about Dylan's alcoholism. He added that it was an example of how unequipped Ethan is to run the department. He concluded that "Ethan looks the part in his smart new suit but he's rubbish at authority!"

Writers continued to create challenges for Ethan to overcome in his new role. Alicia starts an anonymous online blog to record her fears that the emergency department has become a dangerous environment. The blog gains traction and its following gains media interest, which is targeted at Ethan's management. Helpenny told Reilly that Alicia never intended to make a personal attack against Ethan; "she truly believes he is doing the best job he can." It becomes more complicated when the former lovers share a kiss, making Alicia's guilt worse. Ethan's career is put under further scrutiny when consultant Serena Campbell (Catherine Russell) demands the issue be solved. She tells Ethan that if the blog is not removed by the end of his shift, he will have his contract terminated. Writers used the scenes to showcase a more "ruthless attitude" for the character. Ethan decides we will identify the blogger himself. He soon suspects Alicia and confronts her, but she lies to Ethan. Rainsford defended Ethan's ruthless approach noting "he can't keep everyone happy, Ethan in charge isn't a version we've seen of him before." Halfpenny added that Ethan would be annoyed to discover Alicia "blatantly lied" to him, but she believes the blog will "make a difference".

Scott's unresolved death is reincorporated into Ethan's story with the introduction of patient Leigh-Anne Carr (Cassie Bradley). She arrives at the hospital in labour and Ethan helps her give birth. He soon discovers that Leigh-Anne was Scott's girlfriend and he was the father of the baby. Discussing Ethan's new story, Rainsford said "it all flip on its head" and he does not "want to deal with the guilt". When he learns that Leigh-Anne is homeless he eyes redemption; Ethan offers Leigh-Anne money and support for her child. Rainsford believed that his character was perceived as "creepy" and his over-friendly behaviour only made Leigh-Anne suspicious. He added it was an example of Ethan's temperament for over-compensating and finding trouble. Leigh-Anne fins it difficult to trust Ethan because he represents the hospital in which her boyfriend died. Ethan continues with his "misplaced" efforts to help. She soon demands answers regarding Scott's death and Ethan promises that he will help. Rainsford described their new pairing as "a road of inappropriate bonding over the shared experience of grief." Leigh-Anne is grieving for the man who caused Ethan's grief, a development which Rainsord branded "really morally complicated".

Ethan and Leigh-Anne carry on supporting each other and start a casual relationship. Ethan decides he cannot carry on seeing Leigh-Anne and ends their romance. Rainsford told Rebecca Fletcher of What's on TV that they only consoled each other through "grief and loss", but a doctor and patient relationship is "inappropriate". Leigh-Anne is upset with Ethan's choice and tells Ethan that she will make a complaint claiming he abused his power to sleep with a patient. Rainsford told Ellis that Leigh-Anne takes time to assess the situation and realises that Ethan behaved badly. Leigh-Anne has "genuine feelings" for Ethan and wants lover's revenge. He explained that she "really feels aggrieved that she's been treated like this. She can see it's bad ethics on a doctor's part to take advantage of someone who's vulnerable." Alicia manages to convince Leigh-Anne to not pursue the complaint, which leaves Ethan thinking he can rely on Alicia again. He decides to tell her the truth about Scott's death, which puts his leadership role in jeopardy once again. Rainsford added "her reaction makes him paranoid she'll tell somebody" and ruin his career.

=== Posttraumatic stress disorder ===
Writers featured Ethan in a story focusing on the effects that terror attack's have on victims. In Ethan's case this is Posttraumatic stress disorder (PTSD). It begins when Ethan and his HEMS colleague Albert 'Big Al' Layne (Sam Callis), receive an emergency call informing them that a lorry has driven into a crowded indoor market. Rainsford told Hannah Davies of What's on TV that Ethan and Al are "polar opposites" who gain a "mutual respect" of one-another through the events of the attack. They are the first responders to the incident; Rainsford spoke of scenes of "total carnage with blood and bodies everywhere." Ethan tries to save victims from the wreckage, but Al warns him that they need to leave. Ethan continues trying to help and an explosion causes further carnage. Rainsford explained that "all hell breaks loose" and "Ethan puts himself and those around him in danger." Ethan and Al are left trapped under rubble, Ethan is covered in blood and dust. Al supports Ethan and tries to keep him comfortable while the rescue effort continues. Ethan is rescued but Al dies at the scene. Rainsford noted that Ethan had already been through so much trauma and now has to contend with effects of the attack. It took eight days to film the stunt and the scenes were showcased during the opening episode of a series. This meant it was a scaled up production with "exciting equipment and stunts". Wind machines were used to distort the actors faces and crash mats for falling stunts. Rainsford branded the experience one that an actor would pay to participate in. The attack stunts became Rainsford's favourite ever story to film throughout his entire duration.

Ethan soon returns to work but has flashbacks of the attack. Ethan ignores his traumatic thoughts and focuses on treating cystic fibrosis patient Effie Laurence (Abigail Hardingham). Ethan actively chooses to ignore the signs of PTSD believing it will be better distraction to carry on working. The actor told Reilly (What's on TV) that Ethan thinks that "rather than wallowing" he can help Effie, even if it means ignoring "probable PTSD". Writers introduced Effie as a new love interest for Ethan. Rainsford revealed that the romance would be "not without its issues". Writers played Ethan behaving unethically once again, this time using his position to get Effie onto a drugs trial to treat her cystic fibrosis. Ethan covers up an incident which Effie coughed up blood, to get her a place on the medical trial. Effie later becomes ill and Ethan works to save her life once again. The incident leaves Ethan with no choice to end their relationship. Rainsford branded the relationship "inappropriate" but understood that Ethan liked Effie's determination to fight her illness, which resonated with his experiences of Huntington's disease.

The story also explores the hierarchical system of hospitals and the effect of clinical lead off-loading work onto Ethan. In turn, Ethan off-loads onto doctors Rash Masum (Neet Mohan) and Mason Reede (Victor Oshin), who is supposed to mentor. Rainsford branded it a "big storyline" focusing the "true reflection" of NHS staff "struggling under the weight of their responsibilities." Writers continued to develop Ethan's issues but chose to portray his PTSD as undiagnosed. Ethan continues to neglect his mentor duties towards Rash and Mason, who become stressed and overworked. Ethan's behaviour worsens and he launches a verbal attack on Rash, accusing him of negligence. Rash reacts by punching Ethan in the face and Mohan believed this was justified because Ethan was making Rash a "scapegoat" for the hospital's problems. Rainsford added that it was an example of Ethan behaving "really badly" and "acting out of character". He found this segment of Ethan's story difficult to film and had to make sense of why Ethan had become so unethical.

Ethan struggles to deal with survivor's guilt over Al's death; "three months later he still feels awful about it and blames himself intensely." Writers introduced Al's daughter, Abigail Layne (Molly Jackson-Shaw) as a patient in Ethan's care. He and Abigail discuss Al's death and the effects of attack. The scenes lead Ethan into the realisation he needs to solve his issues. Mason is later found dead and Ethan decides to leave the hospital to recover. Rainsford commented that "at that time, Ethan decided his needs were greater. He was blinded by all the other things going on in his head and his life." The "pressure of work" got too much for him and he wanted a break to "clear his head". Rainsford added that Ethan's departure was bad timing because it damaged his working relationship with Rash. He added that Ethan was not responsible for Mason's death but "there certainly is an argument" that Ethan should have remained in the department to help. When Ethan returns, an unprofessional Rash is unable to forgive Ethan and publicly humiliates his senior at work.

=== 40th anniversary ===
Ethan is at St James' Hospital when it is destroyed by an accidental gas explosion but is largely unharmed. He and Charlie arrive at Holby ED and volunteer to help treat the casualties, though Ethan does not admit to Rash that he was at St James' as a patient despite Charlie's recommendation. When Stevie Nash and Flynn Byron are brought in after almost drowning in a quarry, Nicole Piper asks Ethan to help her remove something from Flynn's leg. He initially agrees, but realises that the progression of his Huntington's could potentially endanger Flynn's life and has Rash take over. Ethan later confesses to Charlie that he misses being a doctor, and Charlie encourages him to explore non-emergency medicine.

=== Other appearances ===
In 2015, Ethan appeared in a special mini-episode of Casualty titled "On Call". It was aired via the interactive feature, the BBC Red Button and also released via the BBC iPlayer. The storyline followed the return of Cal's ex-girlfriend Taylor who arrives and hands over her daughter, Matilda, claiming she is Cal's child.

In 2016, Rainsford appeared as Ethan in Casualty's spin-off series Holby City, in the episodes "I'll Walk You Home" and "Missing You Already". He appeared to surprise the character of Arthur Digby (Rob Ostlere) and perform a celebratory dance with fellow characters. Ostlere and Rainsford were long-time friends having attended drama classes together. They had petitioned producers of both shows to enable their character to share a scene together. Their wish was granted in what would be Ostlere's final appearance in Holby City. He also appeared at the characters funeral which aired during the following episode.

In 2018, a trailer teasing the show's summer storylines revealed that Rainsford would appear as Ethan in another episode of Holby City. Further trailers revealed that Ethan would seek help from consultant neurosurgeon professor John Gaskell (Paul McGann) and Roxanna MacMillan (Hermione Gulliford) for his Huntington's diagnosis as part of a research project.

== Reception ==
Ethan & Cal meeting their biological mother was nominated for "Best Drama Storyline" at the 2016 Inside Soap Awards. In August 2017, Rainsford was longlisted for Best Drama Star at the Inside Soap Awards, while Cal's murder (including its effect on Ethan) was longlisted for Best Drama Storyline. Both nominations made the viewer-voted shortlist. On 6 November 2017, Rainsford won the "Best Drama Star" accolade. Katie Baillie from the Metro said that "Holby Sin City" was confusing and "it all went a bit bonkers." She also accused Ethan's story in the episode of being nonsensical. Jack Seale of The Guardian opined that the episode was Sin City done a "doggedly small scale" and branded Ethan a "fussy registrar". Robert Hiley from What's on TV branded Ethan "a brilliant character and an amazing doctor" but opined that he appeared to give up on career progression when Lily was promoted before him. Holly Wade from the Radio Times opined "he has lived in the shadow of his brother Cal for a long time and struggles to come out of his shell. He is a loveable character and definitely the type of thorough doctor that you'd want to be in charge of your case."

A What's on TV writer branded the character "disillusioned doctor Ethan". Producer Oliver Kent admitted that his show had focused too much on Ethan, Connie and Dylan. He added that his team had to remind themselves Casualty was a show about the hospital's nursing staff. Reilly (What's on TV) enjoyed Ethan's "Be More Cal" phase. She said "it's safe to say with lines like ‘how you doin’?’ in the style of Joey from Friends, he's going to provide much comedy over the coming episodes." The critic later stated that "the love-hate storylines between Cal and Ethan have captivated fans and are still going strong." After his work struggles, a reporter from The People said "speccy specialist registrar Ethan Hardy (George Rainsford) is back in the groove, charming more patients in the emergency department."

Inside Soap's Sarah Ellis said that her colleagues were frustrated with Ethan and Alicia's relationship story. They added "the continuing saga between Ethan and Alicia in Casualty has rumbled on for so long that Inside Soap has almost destroyed the office telly by continually throwing stuff at it in frustration." In 2020, Emma Bullimore from Radio Times assessed that Ethan had become "without doubt, one of the most popular characters in Casualty history." She branded him a "really nice guy" who is "shy and bumbling, he has no idea how attractive he is." Despite Ethan's many traumas, Bullimore concluded that "Ethan always tries to do the right thing and stays kind. A proper ED hero." In 2021, Inside Soap's Alice Penwill described defended the character's constant traumatic stories because "Rainsford is just so good at the crying scenes".
