= Hello, I Must Be Going (Casualty) =

- Casualty episode
- Episode no.: Series 30; Episode 34
- Directed by: Steve Hughes
- Written by: Jeff Povey
- Original air date: 7 May 2016
- Running time: 50 minutes

Guest appearances
- Guy Henry as Henrik Hanssen; Kelli Hollis as Shelle Jones; Andrew Knott as Vince Callaghan; Hannah Spearritt as Mercedes Christie; Joanna Croll as Joanna McVie; Ben Jones as Greg Hunter

Episode chronology
← Previous "Tangled Webs We Weave"	Next → "Chain Reaction"
- Casualty series 30

"Hello, I Must Be Going" is the thirty-fourth episode of the thirtieth series of the British medical drama television series Casualty, and the 995th episode of the overall series. The episode was written by Jeff Povey and directed by Steve Hughes, and premiered on BBC One on 7 May 2016. The episode features the departure of established character Zoe Hanna (Sunetra Sarker), an ED consultant, who left the show after nine years. Sarker's departure was kept secret until transmission in order to surprise viewers. Producers were upset when Sarker announced her decision to leave, but ensured writers created a good story for the character.

The episode concluded Zoe's relationship with the porter Max Walker (Jamie Davis), which Sarker labelled as "bittersweet". It also featured the first appearance of Elle Gardner (Jaye Griffiths), an ED consultant, who was held at knifepoint in a hostage situation during the episode. "Hello, I Must Be Going" received positive reviews from critics, who praised Zoe's exit and Elle's introduction. Alison Graham, writing for the Radio Times, labelled the episode "valedictory".

== Plot ==
New ED consultant Elle Gardner (Jaye Griffiths) is running late for her first shift at Holby City hospital. She rushes to the car and, while on the way to the hospital, is held up in traffic. Not wanting to be late, Elle decides to drive through the park, but accidentally hits Vince Callaghan (Andrew Knott), who is also making his way to the ED. Elle calls for an ambulance for Vince, and travels alongside paramedics Iain Dean (Michael Stevenson) and Jez Andrews (Lloyd Everitt) to the ED.

Upon arriving at the ED, Vince jumps out of the ambulance and runs to Shelle Jones (Kelli Hollis), who takes Vince into an empty pub just around the corner from the hospital. Elle, and consultant Zoe Hanna (Sunetra Sarker), follow Vince and Shelle into the pub, and become embroiled in an argument between the pair. Shelle pulls a knife from her pocket and slashes Vince across the arm, severing an artery. Vince falls back and smashes his head against a slot machine. Shelle then targets Elle and Zoe, holding them hostage alongside Vince in the storage room of the pub.

Meanwhile, patient Mercedes Christie (Hannah Spearritt) raises her concerns of not being able to contact Vince, her partner, to porter Max Walker (Jamie Davis). Max asks if anyone has seen Zoe, who is also his partner. Consultant Dylan Keogh (William Beck) reveals he saw Zoe heading for the pub. Max goes over to the pub to investigate, and upon entering the pub, he overhears Shelle shouting in the storage room. He opens the door to the storage room and is almost attacked by a knife-wielding Shelle. Zoe punches Shelle and is stabbed in the hand. The police are called and Shelle is arrested.

Following the hostage ordeal, Zoe returns to the ED, and whilst having her hand treated by Dylan, tells him that she is leaving the hospital in a few hours for Michigan to work for former consultant Nick Jordan (Michael French). Max tells Zoe he is planning to move to America with her, but Zoe sneaks away from the hospital in a taxi to the airport before he can join her. Upon learning she has run away, Max drives to the airport, where he finds Zoe, who tells him their relationship has come to an end, leaving him heartbroken.

== Production ==
External videos
- "A Day to Forget"; A promotional trailer for the episode

"Hello, I Must Be Going" was written by Jeff Povey, whereas Steve Hughes directed the episode and Ella Kelly produced the episode. Erika Hossington served as the series producer and Oliver Kent was the show's executive producer. The soundtrack used in the episode included Queens of the Stone Age's "No One Knows", Diplo and Sleepy Tom's "Be Right There", Aerosmith's "Cryin'", and Foo Fighters' "All My Life". Also featured in the episode was "If This Is Goodbye", as sung in collaboration by Mark Knopfler and Emmylou Harris. This track was played over the departure of Zoe Hanna (Sunetra Sarker). Alison Graham, writing for the Radio Times, warned viewers to "brace [themselves]" for the song. Despite the show being set in the fictitious city of Holby, filming is located at Roath Lock Studios, Cardiff.

"It's a very unusual and interesting episode of Casualty − [it is] not told in a straightforward way. I never thought the show would be so experimental and brave with my character. I watched the episode back the other day, and even after filming it, I still [did not] know what was coming next. I loved it!"

— Sarker on "Hello, I Must Be Going" (2016)

"Hello, I Must Be Going" featured the exit of Sarker, who had appeared in the series as consultant Zoe Hanna since 2007. Her departure had been kept secret until transmission, which surprised viewers. Although Sarker's departure had not been officially confirmed, it was rumoured that she could be leaving. Sarker told Sarah Ellis of Inside Soap that the show's job is to "keep [the audience] guessing" and if they can "figure out" the ending before it transmits, the show have not "done [their] job well". Hossington compared Sarker's decision to leave the series to "losing a member of your family" and "somebody leaving home again", commenting that while she was upset when Sarker opted to leave, she "completely understood" her decision. She added that show writers ensured they had created the "best [story]" for her exit. Following Zoe's departure from the series, BBC Online released a montage of the character's tenure.

The episode spotlighted the conclusion to Zoe's relationship with porter Max Walker, portrayed by Jamie Davis, which was well received by fans and critics. Producers separated the couple by having Zoe have sex with another man in the run up to their wedding. Zoe struggles to be around Max because "when she is, she wants to be him", despite knowing she cannot, so she accepts a job offer in the US and quits her job at the hospital without informing Max. At the start of the episode, the characters wake up together, which Sarker described as "bittersweet" as they have not confronted "the big elephant in the room", which they struggle to do. When Max spots Zoe's suitcase, she is forced to reveal she is leaving and Sarker explained that Max has to "either ask her not to go, or tell her that he's coming, too."

On 24 February 2016, it was announced that Jaye Griffiths had joined the show's main cast as Elle Gardner. Elle was billed as an ED consultant who "struggles to juggle a chaotic family life with the pressures of her job." Griffiths praised her co-stars and called them "extremely welcoming" as well as promising "powerful" storylines for the character. Griffiths visited a hospital to research for the role and watched several operations, which she labelled an "immense privilege". The actress previously appeared in Casualty for one episode as a guest artist in 1993. "Hello, I Must Be Going" marked Griffiths' first appearance in the role.

During the episode, Elle, Zoe and Vince Callaghan (Andrew Knott) are held at knifepoint by Shelle Jones (Kelli Hollis), who repeatedly threatens to harm them. Sarker explained that it is a life-or-death situation and the audience are on tenterhooks and made to feel as though the characters could be killed at any moment. The episode marked Knott and Hollis' final appearance in their respective roles, along with that of Hannah Spearritt, who portrays Mercedes Christie. In addition to this, the episode featured the appearance of Henrik Hanssen, portrayed by Guy Henry, a character who appears regularly in Casualty's spin-off series, Holby City. Two one-time guest stars appeared in the episode, including Joanna Croll, who played Joanne McVie, and Ben Jones in the role of Greg Hunter.

The episode premiered on BBC One on 7 May 2016 and was available to watch on BBC iPlayer for thirty days after its broadcast. The episode was made available for digital download via BBC Store in standard and higher definition.

== Reception ==
=== Ratings ===
The episode received an overnight rating of 3.9 million viewers, which was equivalent to the previous episode. After seven days, the ratings rose to 4.77 million viewers and concluded with a total of 5.03 million viewers after twenty-eight days. "Hello, I Must Be Going" was the fifteenth most-watched programme on BBC One in the week of broadcast. The episode saw a decrease of 50,000 viewers from the previous episode. The following episode increased to 5.44 million viewers.

=== Critical analysis ===
Alison Graham (Radio Times) said that following "bloodstained" Zoe's monologue at the beginning of the "valedictory" episode, "we know it’s a bad last day for the doc." Sue Haasler of Pauseliveaction wrote a positive review of the episode and praised Zoe's decision to leave Max, writing "you have to admire her for that, but it's a strong-willed woman who wouldn’t at least try to change for the sake of the lovely Max." Haasler enjoyed the scene where Zoe said goodbye to Dylan, who she branded "the world’s grumpiest man", and opined it was "as emotional as" her goodbye with Max. The reviewer also praised the introduction of Elle and said she was "looking forward to seeing how her character develops", but the character would have "a tricky job" replacing Zoe.
