= George Rainsford (actor) =

British actor (born 1982)

- Born: 31 July 1982 (age 44); Huddersfield, West Yorkshire, England
- Occupation: Actor
- Years active: 2007–present
- Television: Call the Midwife, Casualty
- Spouse: Jaimi Barbakoff (m. 2012)
- Children: 2

George Rainsford (born 31 July 1982) is a British actor, best known as Jimmy Wilson in Call the Midwife (2012–2013) and Ethan Hardy in Casualty (2014–2023), receiving a nomination for Best Actor at the 2017 TV Choice Awards.

== Early life ==
Rainsford was born in Huddersfield, West Yorkshire. He attended Repton School in Repton, Derbyshire, where he became interested in drama. Whilst reading for a Bachelor of Arts in drama at the University of Manchester, he was involved with the student theatre. He joined the National Youth Theatre in June 2003 and won a Goldman Sachs scholarship to the London Academy of Music and Dramatic Art. After graduating in 2006, he appeared in The Three Musketeers as D'Artagnan at Bristol Old Vic.

== Career ==
He appeared in the first two series of the medical drama Call The Midwife, as Jimmy Wilson.

In September 2013, it was announced that Rainsford would join the main cast of Casualty as Dr Ethan Hardy. He took part in an audition in London and a screen test in Cardiff with Richard Winsor.

In November 2022, it was confirmed in a Metro Soaps interview with Casualty executive producer, Jon Sen, that Rainsford had exited his role as Ethan Hardy after nine years on the series, however, the door would be left open for Rainsford to return in the future, with Sen confirming that it would not be a permanent exit for Rainsford.

== Personal life ==
In November 2009, Rainsford was treated at Salisbury District Hospital for a gashed fist and damaged tendon after accidentally punching Luke Norris during a stage fight in the Royal Shakespeare Company production Days of Significance.

In the summer of 2014, Rainsford took three episodes of Casualty off due to paternity leave. His last episode of 2014 was aired on 29 November, and he returned at the start of 2015. The couple live in Berkhamsted, Hertfordshire.

== Filmography ==
Year	Title	Role	Notes
2007	Panorama	Private Lee	
2008	Doctors	JJ Bell	10 episodes
2008–2009, 2011	Waking the Dead	Luke Boyd	13 episodes
2009	National Theatre Live	Bertram	
2009	Wild Target	Waiter	Film
2011	Secret Diary of a Call Girl	Tim	2 episodes
2011	Law & Order: UK	Jimmy Burton	
2012	Casualty	Alexander Forbes-Blackwell	
2012–2013	Call the Midwife	Jimmy Wilson	7 episodes
2014	Waiting for Dawn	Private James Williams	
2014–2023, 2026	Casualty	Ethan Hardy	Series regular, Guest appearance 40th Anniversary specials
2016, 2018, 2021	Holby City	Ethan Hardy	4 episodes
2025	Bank of Dave 2: The Loan Ranger	Miles	Film

=== Video games ===
Year	Title	Voice role
2015	Dragon Quest Heroes: The World Tree's Woe and the Blight Below	Luceus

== Stage ==
Production	Role	Director	Company
The 24 Hour Plays	Duncan	Lucy Kerbel	The Old Vic
The Three Musketeers	D'Artagnan	Timothy Sheader	Bristol Old Vic
Men without Shadows	Francois	Mitchell Moreno	Finborough Theatre
Chatroom / Citizenship	William / Gary	Anna Mackmin	Royal National Theatre & Tour
Polar Bear	Stuart	Matt Wilde	Birmingham Repertory Theatre
Miles to Go	Rob	Polly Findlay	Latitude Festival
All's Well That Ends Well	Bertram	Marianne Elliott	Royal National Theatre
Days of Significance	Jamie	Maria Aberg	Royal Shakespeare Company Tour
The Man	Ben	Kate Wasserberg	Finborough Theatre
Roald Dahl’s Twisted Tales	Various	Polly Findlay	Lyric Hammersmith
Love Love Love	Jamie	James Grieve	Royal Court Theatre
Peter James' Wish You Were Dead	Roy Grace	Jonathan O'Boyle	UK Tour
2:22 A Ghost Story	Sam	Matthew Dunster & Isabel Marr	UK Tour
Peter James' Picture You Were Dead	Roy Grace	Jonathan O'Boyle	UK Tour
Dear England	Mike Webster	Rupert Goold & Connie Teves	Royal National Theatre on Tour
