= Chelsee Healey =

English actress (born 1988)

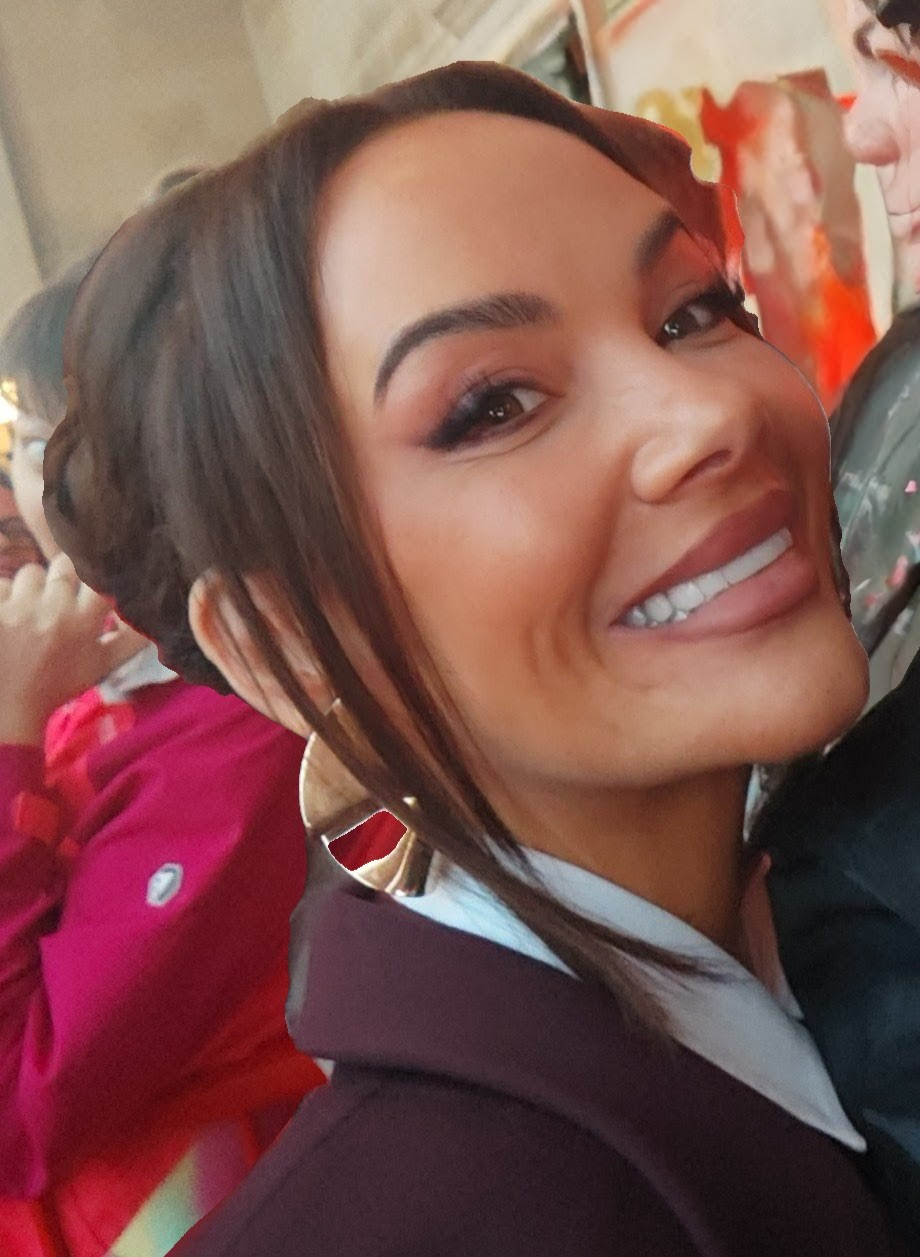
- Healey in 2025
- Born: Chelsea Jade Healey; 6 August 1988 (age 37); Salford, Greater Manchester, England
- Occupation: Actress
- Years active: 2002–present
- Notable work: Waterloo Road (2006–2012, 2023); Hollyoaks (2008, 2016–present); Strictly Come Dancing (2011); Casualty (2014–2015); Get Your Act Together (2015); Bear Grylls: Mission Survive (2016); Dancing on Ice (2025)
- Children: 2

Chelsea Jade Healey (born 6 August 1988) is an English actress. She is known for portraying the roles of Janeece Bryant in the BBC school-based drama series Waterloo Road (2006–2012, 2023), Honey Wright in the BBC medical drama series Casualty (2014–2015) and Goldie McQueen in the Channel 4 soap opera Hollyoaks (2016–2026). She has also appeared as a contestant on the ninth series of Strictly Come Dancing (2011) and the seventeenth series of Dancing on Ice (2025).

== Early life ==
Chelsea Jade Healey was born on 6 August 1988 in Salford, Greater Manchester to Brian Healey, an air conditioning engineer, and Beverley Jarvis. Her father was of Jamaican origin, whilst her mother is white British. She has an older half sister Kate. Healey's father died when she was five years old. She attended Godfrey Ermen Memorial Primary and Canon Williamson High School, before going on to study at Salford City College. She also studied at the talent agency Laine Management.

== Career ==
=== Waterloo Road and acting work ===
Healey's television debut was in the recurring role of Katie Moore in BBC Three drama Burn It in 2003. Between 2006 and 2009, Healey appeared as student Janeece Bryant in four series of the BBC One school-based drama series Waterloo Road, before departing the role in May 2009. Following an extended break from the show, Healey returned to the role during the sixth series in September 2010 as the new school secretary, and continued to appear throughout the entirety of the seventh series. Following the shows relocation to Greenock in Scotland for the eighth series, Healey announced she would be moving north to continue portraying the role. Healey departed the role in August 2012.

Healey has also made guest appearances in the crime drama Conviction, as well as the sitcom Two Pints of Lager and a Packet of Crisps as a member of the 'Chavettes', which Louise had to monitor for her community service. She also appeared in the Channel 4 soap opera Hollyoaks as Michelle in 2008. She has played two different characters in the daytime medical soap opera Doctors in 2004 and 2007 respectively, Ilsa Marsh in the episode "Overdue" and Louise Calvert in "Next Door to Alice". She also made an appearance in the CBBC series Young Dracula as a vampire reporter in 2011.

=== Strictly Come Dancing ===
In 2011, Healey took part in the ninth series of Strictly Come Dancing as a contestant. She was partnered with new professional for the series, Pasha Kovalev. Healey became the first contestant in the series to earn a perfect 40 out of 40 for her Paso Doble, in week 11 of the competition. She finished the series as runner-up behind Harry Judd and Aliona Vilani.

Green numbers show Chelsee & Pasha were at the top of the leaderboard that week.

Week #	Dance/Song	Judges' score					Result
Week #	Dance/Song	Horwood	Goodman	Dixon	Tonioli	Total	Result
1	Waltz/"See the Day"	7	6	7	7	27	No Elimination
2	Salsa/"Higher"	7	7	8	7	29	Safe
3	Cha-Cha-Cha/"Beggin'"	6	8	8	8	30	Safe
4	Quickstep/"Sing Sing Sing"	9	9	9	9	36	Safe
5	Tango/"Love Potion No. 9"	7	8	9	8	32	Safe
6	Charleston/"Five Foot Two, Eyes of Blue"	9	9*	9	9	36	Safe
7	Foxtrot/"Doesn't Mean Anything"	9	8	10	9	36	Safe
8	Samba/"Spice Up Your Life"	8	9	9	9	35	Safe
9	Argentine Tango/"Una Musica Brutal"	8	9	9	9	35	Safe
9	Swing Marathon/"Chattanooga Choo Choo"	Awarded	6	Judges	Points	41	Safe
10	Jive/"I'm a Believer"	9	10	10	10	39	Safe
11	American Smooth/"Time After Time"	8	9	10	9	36	Safe
11	Pasodoble/"Malagueña"	10	10	10	10	40	Safe
12	Jive/"I'm a Believer"	9	10	10	10	39	RUNNERS UP
12	Showdance/"One Night Only"	9	9	9	9	36	RUNNERS UP
12	Rumba/"Because of You"	9	10	10	10	39	RUNNERS UP
12	Quickstep/"Sing Sing Sing"	9	10	10	10	39	RUNNERS UP

- In Week 6 Jennifer Grey guest judged for Goodman.

On 23 March 2012, Healey and Kovalev took part in an underwater special of Strictly Come Dancing in aid of Sport Relief, competing against Judd and Vilani. After resulting in a tie with the judges' scores, they won the show after a decision was made by head judge Len Goodman. On Christmas Day 2012, Healey and Kovalev once again united as part of a "Strictly Allstar" group of seven previous contestants, for a group dance in the 2012 Strictly Come Dancing Christmas Special.

=== Casualty, Hollyoaks and reality television ===
In 2012, she appeared as a panellist on Celebrity Juice, as well as making appearances on Britain Unzipped, Vic and Bob's Lucky Sexy Winners and a Christmas special episode of Celebrity Come Dine with Me. In 2013, Healey appeared on an episode of Pointless Celebrities alongside James Jordan. Healey gave incorrect answers to all four of her questions, including thinking that the Olympic host city that is an anagram of "Gin Jibe" was Belgium.

In 2013, Healey joined Jack Dee, Dara Ó Briain, Greg James, Melanie C and Philips Idowu in Through Hell and High Water, a Comic Relief challenge that involved British celebrities canoeing the most difficult rapids of the Zambezi River. They raised more than £1 million for the charity. In August 2013, she appeared on the comedy panel show I Love My Country.

On 19 May 2014, it was announced that Healey would join the cast of the BBC medical drama Casualty in the regular role of Honey Wright, the emergency department's new tea lady. Honey is billed as a woman with "big hair and a big personality" and regularly gives tarot readings and aura interpretations to staff and patients. The character first appeared in the sixth episode of series 29, on 11 October. The character departed on 14 February 2015, before returning on 25 July. She made a permanent departure on 19 September 2015. In 2015, she participated in the talent show Get Your Act Together and the following year, she took part in Bear Grylls: Mission Survive.

In 2016, Healey joined the cast of the Channel 4 soap opera Hollyoaks as Goldie McQueen, a member of the established McQueen family and mother to twin brothers Hunter (Theo Graham) and Prince McQueen (Malique Thompson-Dwyer). In 2019, Healey appeared in the sixth series of E4 reality dating series Celebs Go Dating. On 20 January 2026 it was announced that Healey had quit her role as Goldie and would be departing later in the year.

In September 2016, Healey appeared on The Chase: Celebrity Special, opposite "The Beast" Mark Labbett and alongside actor Colin Baker, paralympian David Weir, and comedian Alex Horne. In February 2022, Healey was a contestant on the E4 series The Real Dirty Dancing.

In 2022, it was reported that Healey was in talks to return to Waterloo Road after the BBC had announced the series would be returning the following year. She made a cameo appearance in the second episode of the eleventh series, at the funeral of Chlo Grainger (Katie Griffiths). The episode aired in January 2023. In 2025, Healey is set to appear as a contestant on the seventeenth series of Dancing on Ice. She was partnered with Andy Buchanan and the pair were the first couple to be eliminated.

== Personal life ==
Healey has two daughters. Her first daughter was born in July 2017, with previous partner Jack Molloy. Healey gave birth to her second daughter in December 2023, whom she shares with her current partner Eddie.

== Filmography ==
Year	Title	Role	Notes	Ref.
2003	Burn It	Katie Marshall	Main role; 7 episodes	
2004	Conviction	Natalie Wells	2 episodes	
2004	Doctors	Ilsa Marsh	Episode: "Overdue"	
2005	Two Pints of Lager and a Packet of Crisps	Community Service Girl 1	Episode: "Fat"	
2006–2012, 2023	Waterloo Road	Janeece Bryant	Regular role; 106 episodes	
2007	Doctors	Louise Calvert	Episode: "Next Door to Alice"	
2008	Hollyoaks	Michelle	Guest role	
2011	Waterloo Road Reunited	Janeece Bryant	Web series; all 6 episodes	
2011	Young Dracula	Journalist	Episode: "Faustian Slip"	
2011	Strictly Come Dancing	Herself	Contestant; series 9	
2013	Bollywood Carmen	Shazzy	Television film	
2014–2015	Casualty	Honey Wright	Regular role; 23 episodes	
2015	Get Your Act Together	Herself	Contestant	
2016	Bear Grylls: Mission Survive	Herself	Contestant	
2016–2026	Hollyoaks	Goldie McQueen	Regular role	
2019	Celebs Go Dating	Herself	Cast member	
2020	Hollyoaks Later	Goldie McQueen	2020 special	
2022	The Real Dirty Dancing	Herself	Contestant	
2025	Dancing on Ice	Herself	Contestant; series 17	
