= Tony Marshall (actor) =

British actor

- Born: Anthony Marshall; 14 May 1964 (age 62); Oldham, England
- Occupation: Actor thumb
- Years active: 1983–present
- Known for: Life on Mars; Casualty

Anthony Marshall (born 14 May 1964) is a British actor, known for his roles as Nelson in Life on Mars and Noel Garcia in Casualty. He has made appearances in numerous television series, including Coronation Street, The Bill, All Quiet on the Preston Front, The Queen's Nose, Only Fools and Horses and Doctors.

== Career ==
Marshall made his professional acting debut in four episodes of the ITV soap opera Coronation Street, as Roy Valentine.

He appeared in three Christmas episodes of Only Fools and Horses as Chris, a friend of Rodney and Mickey Pearce. The episodes in question were Dates, Rodney Come Home and Mother Nature's Son.

From 2006 to 2007, he portrayed the role of Nelson (the barman of the "Railway Arms") in the BBC drama series Life on Mars and the final episode of its spinoff, Ashes to Ashes.

From 2008 to 2021, he appeared in the BBC medical drama Casualty as receptionist Noel Garcia. In an episode broadcast on 2 January 2021, Marshall's character died of COVID-19. Marshall's departure was kept secret to avoid disappointment; he had played the role for 12 years. Before appearing as Noel, he made two separate guest stars. The first was in the series eight episode "Cat In Hell" as Roy, a train conductor, and the second was in the series eighteen episode "Second Best", where he played an unnamed parking attendant. On 14 March 2017, Marshall appeared as Noel on the sister series, Holby City. He appeared in Holby City again in on 5 March 2019. In 2018, Marshall appeared in an episode of Still Open All Hours, as Mr. Selby.

== Filmography ==
=== Film ===
Year	Title	Role	Notes
2001	Kiss Kiss (Bang Bang)	Boom	
2016	Learning to Breathe	Jimmy	

=== Television ===
Year	Title	Role	Notes
1983	Coronation Street	Roy Valentine	4 episodes
1988–1992	Only Fools and Horses	Chris	3 episodes
1989	Saracen	African waiter	Episode: "Robbers"
1989	The Paradise Club	Chas McGhee	2 episodes
1991–1996	The Bill	Various roles	4 episodes
1992	Second Thoughts	Baz	2 episodes
1993, 2003	Casualty	Roy / Car Park Attendant	2 episodes
1994	Nelson's Column	Steve	Episode: "Out on a Limb"
1994–1997	All Quiet on the Preston Front	Diesel	19 episodes
1995	Live with the Goggles	Camera Operator	4 episodes
1995	Faith in the Future	Lad in Garage	Episode: "Odd Job"
1996	Thief Takers	Tony Watts	Episode: "Going Under"
1998–2000	The Queen's Nose	Animal	3 episodes
1999	Wing and a Prayer	David Lewis	Episode #2.5
1999	Bostock's Cup	Brian Parkinson	Television film
1999	The Flint Street Nativity	Wise Man 2	Television film
2000	Rough Treatment	Patient	Television film
2003	Doctors	Decca	Episode: "Love on the Rocks"
2003	My Family	Edmund	Episode: "Sixty Feet Under"
2005	Judge John Deed	Paul Arrow	Episode: "Above the Law"
2006–2007	Life on Mars	Nelson	12 episodes
2006, 2017, 2019	Holby City	Everton Barrow / Noel Garcia	3 episodes
2008	The Revenge Files of Alistair Fury	Dicko	Episode: "The Gutter Press"
2008–2021	Casualty	Noel Garcia	Main role
2010	Ashes to Ashes	Nelson	Episode #3.8
2018	Still Open All Hours	Mr. Selby	Episode #5.3
2022	Hollyoaks	Security Guard	Episode #1.5833
2023	Sister Boniface Mysteries	Derek Dobson	Episode: "Stage Fright"
2025	Death in Paradise	Delmar Lloyd	Episode: #14.6
