= Casualty series 15 =

Fifteenth series of Casualty

Casualty
- Series 15
- Starring: Donna Alexander; Jan Anderson; Adjoa Andoh; Pal Aron; Ian Bleasdale; Philip Bretherton; Michelle Butterly; Robert Gwilym; Sandra Huggett; Ben Keaton; Ian Kelsey; Kwame Kwei-Armah; Grant Masters; Ronnie McCann; Will Mellor; Zita Sattar; Cathy Shipton; Derek Thompson; Rebecca Wheatley
- No. of episodes: 36

Release
- Original network: BBC One
- Original release: 16 September 2000 – 28 April 2001

Series chronology
- ← Previous; Series 14 Next → Series 16

The fifteenth series of the British medical drama television series Casualty commenced airing in the United Kingdom on BBC One on 16 September 2000 and finished on 28 April 2001.

== Production ==
Rachel Wright took over from Alexei de Keyser as producer for this series.

The episode count increased this series, this time to 36 episodes, including two hour-long self-contained 'specials', "Sympathy for the Devil" (episode 8) and "Something from the Heart" (episode 23), which were shown in addition to the regular Saturday night episodes. This series also contains the two-parter episodes "Choked" (episodes 5 and 6) and "Breaking the Spell" (episodes 35 and 36).

In the series finale, Holly's long-running stalking storyline reaches its climax when she is abducted by Tom and restrained in an abandoned hospital ward. Sandra Huggett, who portrays Holly, described the episode as "pretty creepy", adding that it was "very spooky" and "quite surreal."

== Cast ==
=== Overview ===
The fifteenth series of Casualty features a cast of characters working in the emergency department of Holby City Hospital and Holby Ambulance Service. Fourteen cast members from the previous series reprise their roles in this series.

Robert Gwilym stars as emergency medicine consultant and clinical director Max Gallagher, Ian Kelsey as specialist registrar in emergency medicine Patrick Spiller and Sandra Huggett appears as senior house officer Holly Miles. Derek Thompson continues his role as charge nurse Charlie Fairhead while Cathy Shipton features as Lisa "Duffy" Duffin, as sister. Jan Anderson, Pal Aron and Ronnie McCann continued as staff nurses Chloe Hill, Adam Osman and Barney Wolfe. Ian Bleasdale, Donna Alexander, Michelle Butterly and Kwame Kwei-Armah continue their role as paramedics Josh Griffiths, Penny Hutchens, Mel Dyson and Finlay Newton. Rebecca Wheatley stars as receptionist Amy Howard.

Adjoa Andoh joins the cast in episode 1 as senior staff nurse Colette Kierney alongside Grant Masters as manager Dan Robinson. Ben Keaton reprises his role as Spencer in episode 1, having become a porter. The character was previously portrayed as an alcoholic patient in episodes 16 and 18 of the previous series. Pal Aron departs in episode 6 following his HIV-positive storyline and subsequent wedding to on screen partner Reuben. Despite wanting to be killed off, producers wanted a happy ending for his character.

Philip Bretherton joins in episode 12 as Duffy's husband and registrar Andrew Bower (previously portrayed by William Gaminara) with Kieron Forsyth appearing from episode 13 as anaesthetist Tom Harvey. Zita Sattar arrives in episode 28 as student nurse Anna Paul while Wheatley departed in episode 29 with her replacement receptionist Jack Vincent played by Will Mellor arriving in episode 31. Mellor referred to his character as a "Jack the lad" and admitted that his first time on the Casualty set was a nerve-wracking experience.

The end of the series saw the departure of several cast members. Donna Alexander departs in episode 36 alongside Philip Bretherton, Michelle Butterly, Kieron Forsyth, Sandra Huggett, Grant Masters and Ronnie McCann. Huggett decided to leave Casualty as she did not want to become stuck in the role, "I've had a really good year of storylines - the stalker - so now is the time to come out."

=== Main characters ===
- Donna Alexander as Penny Hutchens (until episode 36)
- Jan Anderson as Chloe Hill
- Adjoa Andoh as Colette Kierney (from episode 1)
- Pal Aron as Adam Osman (until episode 6)
- Ian Bleasdale as Josh Griffiths
- Philip Bretherton as Andrew Bower (episodes 12−36)
- Michelle Butterly as Mel Dyson (until episode 36)
- Robert Gwilym as Max Gallagher
- Sandra Huggett as Holly Miles (until episode 36)
- Ben Keaton as Spencer (from episode 1)
- Ian Kelsey as Patrick Spiller
- Kwame Kwei-Armah as Finlay Newton
- Grant Masters as Dan Robinson (episodes 1−36)
- Ronnie McCann as Barney Woolfe (until episode 36)
- Will Mellor as Jack Vincent (from episode 31)
- Zita Sattar as Anna Paul (from episode 28)
- Cathy Shipton as Lisa "Duffy" Duffin
- Derek Thompson as Charlie Fairhead
- Rebecca Wheatley as Amy Howard (until episode 29)

=== Recurring characters ===
- Arthur Caulfield as Ben Lewis (episode 18)
- Janet Dibley as Amanda Lewis (episodes 18−35)
- Kieron Forsyth as Tom Harvey (episodes 13−36)
- Callum Ray as Louis Fairhead (episodes 5−11)

=== Guest characters ===
- Sam Barriscale as Reuben Hurst (episodes 2−6)
- Christopher Colquhoun as Luke Hutchens (episodes 32−33)
- Shelley Conn as Daljit Ramanee (episodes 5−6)
- Winston Ellis as Joe Bickman (episodes 27−28)
- Glenna Forster-Jones as Mrs. Kierney (episodes 31 and 34)
- Steve Huison as Phil Rees (episodes 5−6)
- Simon Merrells as Ed Jamieson (episodes 35−36)
- Caroline Paterson as Janine Brown (episodes 33−36)
- Raymond Pickard as Mikey Rees (episodes 5−6)
- Nicholas Sidi as Nick Costello (episodes 3−4)
- Morag Siller as Leona (episode 6)
- Nicola Stephenson as Julie Fitzjohn (episode 22)
- Nicholas Tizzard as PC McCormack (episodes 3−23)
- Charis Thomas as Natalie Mackay (episodes 35−36)

== Episodes ==
No. overall	No. in series	Title	Directed by	Written by	Original release date	UK viewers (millions)
285	1	"Phoenix"	Tim Leandro	Ben Cooper	16 September 2000	9.86
Duffy is in charge of the department while Charlie is recovering from his pulmonary embolism. She has agreed to have beds put in the department but Max isn't happy so she asks their new manager, Dan Robinson, to sort it. Adam tells Chloe and Barney he has got a place with Reuben, while the staff receive a postcard from Sam and Tina. Spencer is now working at the department as a health care assistant and sees two youths, Luke and Andy, hanging around the nursing home; they have just burgled Chloe. The pair later break into a neighbour's house thinking she is on holiday only to find she is still there. They are also disturbed by neighbour Colette Kierney and during an escape attempt Andy falls through a conservatory. Colette patches him up until Josh and Fin arrive; Josh patronises Colette's efforts but later learns she is joining A&E as an F Grade nurse. Luke follows Spencer into the boiler room and threatens him but manages to get himself hit in the face with steam. He will be left with a scarred face and will possibly be blinded, so Chloe and Spencer decide not to report him to the police. Duffy and Patrick learn Spencer is sleeping in the boiler room after being thrown out of his bedsit so Patrick arranges for him to stay in an on call room temporarily. Charlie (Derek Thompson) meets a young mother and her baby, Phoenix. The woman then disappears, leaving the baby with him. Charlie arranges for the police to take him to hospital, then tracks the mother down to a house boat, where she has taken an overdose. He gets her to hospital and learns Phoenix's father died in a cliff walking accident. The incident convinces him he's ready to return to work. Guest starring Marcia Warren, Sylvano Clarke, Stuart Morris and Honeysuckle Weeks Return of Spencer (Ben Keaton) and arrival of Senior Staff Nurse Colette Kierney (Adjoa Andoh) and Department Manager Dan Robinson Note:Title Sequence (Light Green/Turquoise) changed
286	2	"Accidents Happen"	Dominic Lees	Jeff Povey	23 September 2000	9.24
Charlie returns to work and immediately has a go at Dan about the beds in A&E. Dan wants a staffmember to be interviewed by a reporter from the Gazette so Max and Charlie pressgang Holly into it. A man, Brian, says goodbye to his disabled wife Cheryl before going to a job interview, where he reveals that he accidentally pushed Cheryl off a balcony, causing her to miscarry and leaving her in a wheelchair. A teenage boy, Denny, is taken to football training by his mother Jody: He is unaware that his coach, Ed, is his father, who wants it kept quiet since he has a family of his own. Ed takes Denny for a ride on his motorbike; Jody follows with his inhaler. Her trying to attract their attention and Brian trying to call Cheryl causes motorbike and car to collide. Brian, Ed and Denny are taken to the hospital with minor injuries, but then the car explodes: Jody takes most of the blast and Mel suffers minor injuries. Charlie has the bed patients taken up to wards to make space; he expects a showdown with Dan and is bemused when Dan agrees with the decision. Jody, needing surgery, tells the staff that Ed is Denny's father; Ed admits to Denny that it is true but after a chat with Chloe he tries to accept it. Brian feels guilty about causing another accident but Cheryl tells him he got the job. Patrick treats a young girl who has swallowed some batteries and realise she is anaemic. Josh apologises to Colette, who made a similar mistake with Charlie. Colette gets the junior nurses to fine Patrick for every time he is rude but the joke backfires when he is hurt by it and when Spencer reveals he has bought them all pizza. Guest starring Paul Bown, Joseph Swash and Jayne Ashbourne
287	3	"Getting to Know You"	Ged Maguire	Simon Moss	30 September 2000	9.48
A boy is brought in after sticking a screwdriver in an electric socket while his mother's boyfriend was looking after him. The mother blames the boyfriend until she sees how much the boy likes him. A couple meet on a blind date set up by a dating agency but things are instantly awkward: The man claimed to be younger than he is and the woman claimed to be an architect when she is actually an architect's secretary. The man is hit in the face by a door and starts bleeding heavily, having recently had a nose job. Despite this, when they get talking at the hospital, the couple get on well and agree to see each other again. A couple, Trevor and Louise, take their daughter Jess out to celebrate her 15th birthday but Louise leaves when Trevor gets drunk. He later passes out so Jess decides to drive him home. A young man, Edward, has just met up with his long lost sister Agatha, who was taken to Australia after being given up for adoption. The two cars collide; Trevor, Jess and Edward only have minor injuries but Agatha has a fractured pelvis. Edward tells her their father used to beat him and their mother gave her up to save her from the same fate. Trevor is assumed to have been driving and doesn't correct anyone. Barney is rude to both him and Spencer, and tells Chloe his father was an alcoholic. Jess admits the truth when Trevor is about to be arrested for drink driving and it transpires she was also over the limit: She has been drinking in her room, following her father's example. They are both arrested and decide to get clean together. Charlie tells Duffy that Baz is moving to Canada and taking Louis with her; Louis is staying with him for a few weeks. Reuben proposes to Adam, who accepts. Holly meets with journalist Nick Costello and lets slip that one of the nurses in the department is HIV positive. Guest starring Terence Beesley, Caroline Harding and Jessica Hooker
288	4	"Too Tight to Mention"	Gill Wilkinson	Suzie Smith	7 October 2000	9.89
A woman, Frances, is bothered about not seeing her daughter Claire on her birthday. Her new husband James takes her to Claire's place – she is living in a rundown flat, having split up with her boyfriend – but Josh and Mel have already taken Claire and her daughter Rosie to hospital after Rosie broke her wrist. Frances and James follow them there: Patrick and Colette discover Rosie has swallowed rat poison which has affected her clotting and Claire is also ill with leptosis from drinking water infected by rats. Claire and Frances reconcile. Reuben is seen by Chloe after super-gluing a teddy bear to his hand. John Pennington arranges to meet his mistress at his office but his wife Viv has accidentally started a fire there by leaving her scarf on a heater. He is hit by a backblast, suffering superficial burns. Adam treats him in hospital. Viv learns of the affair and tells him that since the business is in her name and their loan is in his, she can cut him out of the former and leave him to pay off the latter. Charlie gets a call from Nick about an HIV positive nurse and Holly asks him to let her talk to Nick. Nick turns up as a patient, using a false name, and meets Adam. Holly convinces him to keep quiet but John overhears from the next cubicle and calls the paper. Guest starring Nicholas Sidi, Carol Drinkwater and Duncan Preston
289	5	"Choked – Part One"	Robert Del Maestro	Katharine Way	14 October 2000	9.97
Adam and Reuben are discussing their wedding plans; the staff think they are attending a housewarming party. They see a girl, Becca, choking and Adam saves her. Charlie has to bring Louis into work and Dan shows him the paper has a headline about an "AIDS nurse". One patient, Duggan, refuses to let Barney treat him unless he confirms it isn't him so Patrick throws him out. Spencer ejects one reporter but another, Datij, ambushes Adam and records a confession. Adam has to try to explain to Becca and her mother Karen. Dan wants him to resign and take an administrative job. Reuben turns up to try to support Adam, telling Charlie and Amy he is HIV positive as well. Duffy orders Chloe to help Max treat her old French teacher, Janet, who used to bully her. Chloe realises there is more wrong with her than there appeared and she turns out to have a mild brain tumour. Janet insists Chloe only made something of her life because she put pressure on her. A boy, Joel, is staying with his aunt and uncle and runs away. His cousin Mikey tracks him down to a quarry where they have an argument and Mikey falls. Joel calls an ambulance then runs away. Josh and Mel arrive and Josh climbs down but an avalanche buries them both. Guest starring Matthew Lockwood, Laura Aikman and Georgina Hale
290	6	"Choked – Part Two"	Robert Del Maestro	Katharine Way	15 October 2000	9.30
Josh is mostly unhurt and gets Mel to call an air ambulance. Mikey is taken to hospital with his legs broken. Joel turns up and Barney takes him to his family. Joel's father killed his mother and he feels guilty that he ran off instead of helping her but Mikey tells him he'd have done the same thing. Colette meets two ageing hippies, Billy and Elaine; Billy has a cut finger. Elaine has a massive stroke and dies in Resus. After talking with Reuben, Adam decides to make a statement to the press and tells them he is the nurse and he has never put patients at risk; Charlie stops Dan intervening. Dan wants Adam to take leave and an admin post but Adam decides to quit, since the ED isn't the place for him, and get a place on a ward. Meanwhile, Leona (Morag Siller) is back in the department. Patrick examines her but she seems to just have wind. Charlie later finds her in labour and he and Patrick deliver a baby girl who she names Charlie Patricia. As a result, Charlie is late to Adam and Reuben's wedding; he was meant to be bringing the rings so Josh and Fin donate theirs for the self-performed ceremony (since same sex marriage had not yet been legalized). The others continue with the party as Adam and Reuben drive off on their honeymoon to the sound of salsa. Guest starring Raymond Pickard, Anita Dobson and Murray Head Final appearances of Staff Nurse Adam Osman (Pal Aron) and Reuben Hurst (Sam Barriscale)
291	7	"Travelling Light"	Michael Owen Morris	Matthew Leys	21 October 2000	9.01
Josh and Penny bring in an engaged couple who were in a car accident. The man dies of his injuries and the woman's mother has to break the news to her. Josh is bothered by Patrick's attitude towards patients and challenges him to spend a shift with the ambulance crews. A comedian slips on a banana skin after a gig. He is found smoking marijuana at the hospital and rejected by his friends. A rugby player objects to having to wait in reception, having a go at relief receptionist Jessica, but Charlie calms him down and gets him seen to. Charlie asks Spencer to keep an eye on Louis until the childminder arrives but Dan ends up taking over. A teenage girl goes out with her boyfriend, with her father showing no interest in her. She gets an amateur tongue piercing which leaves her badly cut. Her boyfriend helps her father see he has been ignoring her since her mother left and he promises to do better. A couple from the Czech Republic arrive with their daughter, seeking asylum. The daughter is hit by a baggage trolley and taken to hospital where it is discovered the father has bad bruising from being beaten: He was tortured by skinhead thugs looking for their son. When Max offers to help find him, the man admits he told the thugs where to find their son and he was beaten to death. His wife is initially furious but Max tells her of Frank's murder and convinces her to forgive him. Guest starring Etela Pardo, Robert Jezek and Gary Webster
292	8	"Sympathy for the Devil"	Michael Owen Morris	Len Collin	22 October 2000	7.40
Josh and Fin are on duty at a protest about houses being demolished for a supermarket, which is headed by local councillor John Hughes. A woman is dragged out of the house she has been squatting in and hit with a brick so she is taken to hospital. Her sister tries to get her to come and live with her but Max discovers she has an aneurysm and she is rushed into theatre. Josh and Fin are called to John's home after a call about breathing difficulties but they find he has been stabbed; his wife Laura and son Paul are cagey and Fin is suspicious. Paul sabotages the ambulance and radio and holds them hostage with a poker to stop them helping John; he reveals that John beats Laura and burns her with cigarettes, and Paul stabbed him to stop him burning Laura with a lighter. The arrival of Penny and Mel lets them talk Paul down but John dies in Resus and Paul is arrested. An elderly man, Freddie, argues with his friend Ivy, with whom he has a bickering relationship, then collapses and is taken to hospital. Ivy goes back to the house to get his things where she starts burning his collection of old newspapers. She finds a room upstairs with old photos of them and a wedding dress, but a spark from her bonfire causes the house to catch fire and she has to be rescued by the fire brigade. She tells Penny and Mel that a mix-up saw her and Henry miss a planned meeting in 1944; she married a Canadian airman who died in the war instead and Henry locked himself away in the house he had bought for them. Henry tells the same story for Chloe. The three women concoct a story of the fire starting by accident and suggest the couple put the wedding dress to use. Guest starring Jenny Seagrove, Beverley Callard, Callum Blue and Freddie Jones
293	9	"No More Mr. Nice Guy"	Adrian Bean	Chris Jury	28 October 2000	8.77
Patrick (Ian Kelsey) spends a day with paramedics Josh (Ian Bleasdale) and Fin (Kwame Kwei-Armah). Deliberately winding them up, Patrick is not the most popular of passengers. When they are called out by a group of down-and-outs, Patrick dismisses one of them who has collapsed as a drunk and Josh has to take him to hospital to stop the group turning on them. The hospital is short-staffed, with Colette running things and Spencer away, so Dan volunteers his services as a porter for the day. Chloe gets a businessman with a cut finger to stay in case there is nerve damage, meaning he misses a meeting, and he is furious when Max says he simply needs stitches. He then faints and falls off the trolley; a CT scan shows he has a brain tumour and Dan is quick to argue that the fall saved his life. A woman has injured herself trying to keep an older woman out of the house; the woman is her mother, who she hasn't seen in seventeen years since she was taken into care after being locked alone in the flat for two weeks. Her mother was an alcoholic but insists she is dry now. She collapses and turns out to have terminal liver damage. Holly gets the pair talking and they consider staying in touch. Chloe is worried when her bank manager calls; she and Barney are both applying for Adam's job. Patrick, Josh and Fin head to a car crash and Patrick sits with the driver while the fire brigade cut him out: He was an engineer who was promoted into an office job and promptly had two heart attacks and quit. He has bought chocolates for his wife to apologise for an argument and asks Patrick to give them to her. Although they get him out of the car, he is pronounced dead in Resus. Patrick goes against his usual habits by insisting on talking to the man's wife himself. Guest starring Juliet Cowan, Theresa Streatfield and Michael Troughton
294	10	"States of Shock"	Albert Barber	Susan Boyd	4 November 2000	8.35
A young man is rushed into hospital after being stabbed. His father turns up but can only watch as he is declared dead. He tells Barney that he only just got back in touch after walking out on his son when he was a boy. He convinced his son to go to the football with him and gave him his scarf, but it resulted in him being attacked and stabbed by opposing fans while his father ran off and left him. A middle-aged man takes his wife to a clinic for electro-convulsive therapy, which his daughter disapproves of. The staff want her to stay afterwards to monitor her diabetes but she insists on leaving, then collapses from a hypo. At the department, her muttering cause her husband to admit she was abused by her father as a child; he told her they didn't need to mention it again when she told him, but keeping it bottled up has left her clinically depressed so he agrees she needs counselling. Two teenage girls, Chantelle and Emma, see an old lady, Eleanor, fall over in the street after her dogs are startled by a firecracker but Emma stops Chantelle, who is doing a first aid course with Penny, helping out. Fin and Mel arrive but Mel refuses to go near the dogs, leaving Fin to do everything, and explains she was attacked by one as a child. Penny is doing a collection for a colleague's wedding but Chloe can't afford it. Chloe leaves the department without permission to go to the bank and Eleanor accuses her of stealing her purse; however, Fin and Mel find it in the ambulance. Duffy reprimands Chloe. Chantelle and Emma are caught shoplifting at the mall and are chased by security guards; Emma runs into a mini-truck and injures her leg. Chantelle looks after her until the ambulance arrives but Emma blames her, saying she wrecked her running career and Chantelle's mother lets her boyfriend visit her in prison but not her. Duffy learns Andrew will be working at Holby when Broadway General closes and is uncomfortable about working with both him and Max, but Max thinks it won't be a problem. Guest starring Fred Ridgeway, Lucy Fleming and Michael Keating
295	11	"Marking Time"	Patrick Tucker	Len Collin	11 November 2000	8.91
Fin and Mel are working a shift in the department for training. Mel helps Colette with a boy who has got his arm caught in a tube. Patrick and Fin meet a prisoner brought in under guard after self-harming; he has been in prison since he was fifteen for killing his foster parents. The incident was prompted by the prison art teacher showing his paintings to a woman running an exhibition; the woman turns out to be his foster sister, who was away when he killed her parents, and has to be restrained from attacking him at the hospital. Duffy gets them talking for the first time and he explains her parents were planning to send him away; they both begin their healing. Two war veteran brothers are brought in after getting into a fight at a Remembrance Day parade; Bill was a soldier and Larry a conscientious objector and stretcher bearer, who told Bill his flies were undone during the silence. They clash over their differing ideologies but when Bill has a mild heart attack, Spencer and Bill's daughter get them to admit they are proud of each other. Charlie takes Louis to the zoo on his day off but loses him while helping a man who had a seizure; he turns up being looked after by a lonely man who doesn't get to see his own son. Charlie and Amy arrange a surprise party for Duffy's 40th birthday; Max fails to get her to come to the pub for a drink so Dan gets her there instead. Guest starring James Barriscale, Patrick Godfrey and John Normington
296	12	"Starting Over"	Graham Moore	Kathrine Smith	18 November 2000	8.92
Andrew Bower (Philip Bretherton), Duffy's husband, has returned to the department following Broadway General's closure. He brings in a woman he found collapsed in the car park from a drug overdose; she asks them to call her ex-boyfriend, then exaggerates her condition so he'll stay. Duffy forces him to tell her he has a new girlfriend. He then blames Duffy when the woman promptly goes to the house and attacks his girlfriend. A man is about to go to court, where he expects to get six months. His teenage son helps some other lads rob a warehouse but when they are disturbed by the manager he falls from a wall trying to escape, while the rest of the gang knock the manager over. Josh and Fin insist on taking them both to hospital; the boy's mother turns up and his father follows on, saying his court appearance was delayed. He gets into an altercation with the warehouse manager when Spencer lets slip that he's there; Barney blasts Spencer and Chloe tells Spencer about Barney's father. Andrew convinces Max to let him do surgery on the boy's facial injuries. The father is arrested for non-appearance in court and admits to his son that he exaggerated his exploits. An elderly lady is visited by the postman and later by an environmental health officer who has had complaints about her cats. She trips and falls and is found by the postman and his wife; in her absence, her cats are taken away. She suddenly deteriorates while being taken to theatre and dies in Resus. It turns out that she has left everything to the postman and they deduce she wrote letters to herself so he'd come and see her. Charlie tells Duffy he's taking Louis to Baz in Canada. Guest starring Melanie Ramsay, Sean Harris, Brian Croucher and Anna Wing Andrew Bower is reintroduced
297	13	"If You Go Down to the Wards Today"	Kate Cheeseman	Jeff Povey	25 November 2000	8.91
Max and Colette look after a private detective who fell off a ladder photographing a client's husband with another woman; he tells Spencer the other woman was his former wife and he is hoping to use the photo to get her to return his Elvis photos. A married woman, Ashley, receives a visit from Pamela, the wife of one of her husband Declan's colleagues, then collapses with stomach pains. In hospital, she admits to having liposuction. Colette recognises Declan; they had an affair which she ended when she found out he was married and he is now having an affair with Pam. Declan explains the affairs started after Ashley had a miscarriage but decides to end them and make a go with Ashley. Chloe and Barney interview for the E grade post; afterwards, Charlie tells Chloe she has the job and also books a flight to Canada. Teenager Lenny tries to get another boy, Bobby, to sell ecstasy for him but both Bobby and Lenny's girlfriend Eliza are disgusted. A scuffle causes Bobby to have a sickle cell crisis and Eliza accompanies him to hospital, taking the drugs with her. Holly is taking a group of schoolchildren on a tour of the department and Eliza hides the drugs in a teddy left unattended. Lenny turns up and threatens Bobby until Eliza tells him where the drugs are but is caught with them by the police. The bear's head is ripped off in the confusion and Patrick stages a mock operation to reattach it with anaesthetist Tom Harvey and Holly acting as nurse. However, he fails to charm the group's teacher who turns out to be engaged. Guest starring Carol Starks, Seamus Gubbins and Matt Sergeant Tom Harvey is introduced
298	14	"Coming Clean"	Julie Edwards	Patrick Melanaphy	2 December 2000	8.21
Duffy is distracted at work and admits to Colette that she might be pregnant. Colette gets her to take a test which comes back positive but she is reluctant to tell Andrew. Chantelle and her friend Robyn kidnap Robyn's father Stuart, one of their teachers, to hold him to ransom for charity. They take him to a warehouse where Robyn's boyfriend Martin shoots him with a water pistol and causes him to fall through a hole in the floor. Chantelle looks after him until Fin and Mel arrive; he has injured his spine but should recover. Robyn claims Martin was a friend of Chantelle's and her mother tries to ban Chantelle from the house but relents when Duffy tells her she helped Stuart. An elderly woman is brought in by her daughter and son-in-law; it turns out she has been bitten by a black widow spider belonging to their son. The son-in-law admits he hid it in her bed as a joke, not realising it was poisonous. The spider gets loose in the hospital but the boy catches it humanely and hands it over to Environmental Services. Josh volunteers to pick up dry cleaning for Colette. Spencer injures his arm hanging Christmas decorations and Barney is ordered to patch him up. When he learns Chloe told Spencer about his father, Barney trashes a cubicle in a fury. Although Patrick and Spencer cover it up, Duffy warns Barney to shape up. Guest starring Melissa Batchelor, Jocelyn Barker and Campbell Morrison
299	15	"Chinese Whispers"	Alan Wareing	Clive Dawson	9 December 2000	9.41
A woman is brought in after being sick and asks Andrew if she has been poisoned. Her husband turns up but she insists that her husband died in a car crash they were both in weeks earlier and he is an imposter. The psychiatric registrar realises she has a Capgras delusion and is unable to recognise him as her husband; they are unable to bring her out of it. Dan plays squash with Patrick and asks him about Holly. He later asks Holly to help out with a mock major incident: Only she and Max will know it isn't real. A woman is brought in after clubbing; the staff and her sister, who raised her after their parents died, suspect she has taken drugs. Patrick realises she actually has cardiomyopathy and the sisters begin to develop a more equal relationship. Colette has been left in charge again with Duffy away and realises Andrew doesn't know about the pregnancy. A young woman superglues herself to her ex-boyfriend to stop him moving away. While they are waiting to be separated, they resolve their differences. Barney apologises to Chloe, but not Spencer, and they join Holly, Penny, Mel, Tom and Colette for a drink after shift. Barney starts a fight with two men he catches spiking Chloe's drink and ends up being arrested. Guest starring Theresa Fresson, Julian Sims and Sam Friend
300	16	"A Turn of the Scrooge"	Simon Meyers	Simon Moss	16 December 2000	9.90
Charlie returns from Canada and immediately has to deal with Barney, who the police released with a caution. Charlie sends him home because of his bruised face. He confides in Duffy that Baz is seeing someone else; a patient who slipped over on the frozen payment gives him advice on getting a divorce. A middle-aged man, Clifford, is bothered by his neighbour Barry putting up Christmas decorations around the house. One of them interferes with the television aerial and Barry falls off the roof fixing it. Clifford finds that most of Barry's cards and presents are from himself and reveals his wife died at Christmas; they make tentative plans to spend it together. Patrick is looking forward to spending Christmas with his family but Max tells him they both have to work. Holly invites him to a paediatricians' dinner. A café worker is brought in with food poisoning and admits he took food from work that had gone off because he can't afford to eat. Colette tells the café owner that if she doesn't pay the staff a proper wage, she will get the nurses to boycott her. A young pregnant woman is involved in a minor car accident after a row with her boyfriend. Andrew gives her an ultrasound which shows the baby is fine and her boyfriend proposes to her. Andrew's reaction prompts Duffy to finally tell him about her pregnancy but he reacts badly. Guest starring Kenneth Colley, Michael Starke and Louise Bush
301	17	"Merry Christmas Dr. Spiller"	Michael Owen Morris	Jeff Povey	23 December 2000	9.77
Dan is playing Christmas carols in the department; Duffy tells Charlie about her pregnancy and he passes it on to Dan, who frustrates Duffy and Andrew by announcing it to everyone. An elderly man has bruised his elbow cutting down a Christmas tree and is left waiting in reception for his son to pick him up. He eventually admits to Chloe that he hasn't spoken to his son in ten years and she persuaded him to call him. A teenage girl learns that her father's girlfriend is pregnant and goes to the loft to look at photos of her late mother. Her father ends up falling down some stairs after following her up and she tries to hide the fact he is in hospital from his girlfriend. It turns out she has a hole in her heart and will die soon without a transplant; she is worried her father will forget her like he did her mother. A vicar cancels the Christmas service and then tells his brother, who has been staying with him since he was released from prison, that a chalice has gone missing from the church and he will have to leave. He then collapses and his brother phones an ambulance. Penny and Mel discover he is having cancer treatment and, with the ambulance stuck in a snow drift, Max is forced to instruct them to inflate a collapsed lung via radio. The brother discovers the vicar hid the chalice himself; he feels guilty that he followed the church line and condemned a parishioner's homosexual relationship, resulting in his partner committing suicide, and wanted his brother gone so he would die alone. Amy has invited Chloe round for Christmas and is hoping for a quiet one but Chloe invites Max, Charlie and Spencer. Charlie also announces that since the next shift can't get in because of the snow everyone will have to stay on. Holly (Sandra Huggett) has taken Patrick (Ian Kelsey) to a Christmas meal but is met with snide remarks and sarcasm from the ever moody registrar. On the way back to the department for their shifts, Patrick's car breaks down in the snow and the two medics are forced to seek shelter in a disused barn after Patrick injures his ankle. He reveals his mother died at Christmas when he was ten. Holly leaves, uncomfortable, when he suggests she is lonely and manages to get a phone signal to call for help. When she returns to the barn, she finds Patrick asleep. Guest starring Windsor Davies, Alexander Hanson and Philip Whitchurch
302	18	"Epiphany"	Dominic Lees	Suzie Smith	30 December 2000	10.40
A hospital regular, Sally, is hanging around the department. When she tells some parents that their son has died from asthma complications, Charlie throws her out and she falls down a hole. Barney (Ronnie McCann) and Spencer (Ben Keaton) find her and get her out but Barney is left trapped in the hole. He tells Spencer to get Sally to hospital and in his absence manages to burst a pipe causing the hole to fill with water. Spencer returns in time to save him and Barney finally accepts he has been treating Spencer unfairly. Patrick finds evidence Sally had tuberculosis as a child; she tells Colette that she has fond memories of being looked after in hospital and that her brother died and her parents didn't tell her for weeks, which is why she spoke to the parents. A bickering pair of friends go to a New Year's party but the woman falls down some stairs onto broken glass. The man admits at the hospital that he has feelings for her. Duffy tells Charlie that Andrew doesn't want the baby. Holly receives a birthday card that she assumes is from Patrick but is implied to be from Dan. A heroin addict, Johnny, comes in with an injured leg. Max (Robert Gwilym) finds Johnny's friend Ben trying to steal needles and gives him some clean ones. Ben is later brought in after overdosing and tells his mother Amanda what Max did. Amanda tells Max and Charlie that she's going to make sure everyone knows. Guest starring Nicholas Lane, Eliza McClelland and Ian Embleton
303	19	"On the Edge"	Kate Cheeseman	Carolyn Sally Jones	6 January 2001	9.63
Chantelle helps Fin and Penny put on a first aid demonstration at a village hall. One of the boys, Gary, tries to crack on to his brother Nathan's friend Lynsey and shows Nathan up by daring him to climb a wall. The two brothers later argue but Gary collapses from an irregular heartbeat. They make up at the hospital and Gary encourages Nathan to ask Lynsey out. A single mother is unable to find a babysitter in order to go out with her boyfriend so he gets a friend's sister to come over. She later falls asleep and wakes to find the boy has fallen off a kitchen surface. She calls Josh and Mel but Mel is unable to enter the house when she sees a dog there. At the hospital, the boy is diagnosed with a minor skull fracture and Andrew realises the babysitter has narcolepsy. Charlie treats a man with a fractured wrist who had earlier been annoyed with Amy about waiting times; on learning he is a lawyer, he asks advice about applying for custody of Louis, who Baz will not let leave Canada. Chloe receives flowers from a secret admirer. Max and Dan meet Janet to discuss her complaint; Dan starts to defend Max but Janet has already accepted he was trying to help Ben and apologises. Guest starring Melissa Batchelor, Clare Perkins and Valentine Hanson
304	20	"Girl Power"	N.G. Bristow	Matthew Leys	13 January 2001	10.02
Chantelle's father Jerry comes to her foster home but her foster parents, Beth and Tim, send him away without telling her. Chantelle chases after him and Beth is hit by a car going after her; Chantelle looks after her until Penny and Mel arrive. Jerry goes to the hospital where he and Chantelle get on. The experience inspires Penny to search for her own father. Holly receives a book of sonnets as a present from her admirer. A veteran burglar, Brian, and his young partner Owen break into a house but Brian has a heart attack and Owen leaves him behind when the couple that live there, Simon and Monica, come home unexpectedly. Brian learns Owen took Monica's father's wedding ring which is against his rules; he steals it back from Owen, who is planning to get a job, and gives it to Monica. He has a second attack while she is with him and dies. Simon's lack of compassion prompts Monica to break up with him. Andrew tells Duffy he will consider keeping the baby. A Spice Girls tribute act, The Spice is Right, are performing when their equipment fails and two of them suffer an electric shock. One of them turns out to be pregnant and Duffy is frustrated at how ready Andrew is to organise an abortion for her. The father turns out to be the manager, who has been doing the rounds with the group; they fire him. Guest starring Tessa Pritchard, Bill Fellows and James Ellis
305	21	"Heart of Gold"	Albert Barber	Ben Cooper	20 January 2001	9.09
Spencer (Ben Keaton) attends the funeral of an old naval comrade, after which one of his old shipmates, Tommy, asks him to look at his younger pregnant girlfriend Bridget; they are hiding from her father but Tommy doesn't tell them it is their old master-at-arms Macready. Spencer lets them hide out in his flat. Holly (Sandra Huggett) is moving house but one of the removal men has injured his arm and the other is his infirm dad. She asks Patrick (Ian Kelsey) for help and finds him in bed with a nurse. Spencer persuades Patrick to look at Bridget but they are both taken hostage by Macready, who takes them to a house boat then sends his son John to get Bridget. Spencer tells Patrick he turned to drink after a young rating under his command died of hypothermia after falling into Antarctic waters. Patrick talks to Holly on the phone and tries to tip her off. Both Holly and John turn up at Spencer's flat as Tommy and Bridget are fleeing and a chase along a country road sees John crash into a shack. Macready hears the crash on the phone and is disarmed without a fight, with Holly and Tommy looking after John until the ambulance arrives. Patrick agrees not to tell the police what happened if Macready seeks psychiatric help. Guest starring Alex Quine, Barry McCormick and John Woodvine
306	22	"Better Safe Than Sorry"	Tim Holloway	Chris Jury	27 January 2001	9.13
The department is overcrowded with patients on trolleys and Charlie is not happy about new guidelines Dan is implementing for the situation. A man who has told his younger boyfriend he is giving up smoking lights up in his car but then drops the cigarette, causing him to crash the car. He also has chest problems but keeps sneaking away for a smoke at the hospital, even setting off the fire alarm in his cubicle, until his boyfriend leaves him. A young woman is brought in after being found unconscious in a student flat with suspected carbon monoxide poisoning. Andrew recognises her as someone who used to come into Broadway with made-up illnesses and suspects she poisoned herself but her symptoms aren't consistent. She is taken to a ward with organ failure and a slim chance of survival. A dictatorial father takes his son for rugby practise before his first game but hits his head on a post and then collapses with a coughing fit. He tries to get his wife to take the boy to the game but the boy admits he doesn't like rugby and the father accepts he got it wrong. Max and Andrew realise all three patients have Legionnaires' disease and all of them visited the hospital recently. Dan is unconvinced they are the source, since no other patients on the ward have it, but Charlie insists on calling Environmental Health. Dan discovers all three also have links to the local college, supported when a student who has never been to the hospital before also turns out to have the disease, but the hospital block will have to remain closed until the tests come back. Guest starring Gary Beadle, Daniel Anthony and Joanne Froggatt
307	23	"Something from the Heart"	Paul Duane	Graham Mitchell	2 February 2001	7.82
Two American tourists, Richard and Debbie, are brought in after being mugged; Richard was stabbed and is in a critical condition. Charlie listens to a radio interview with MP Jane Taylor, which is edited to make it sound like she is blaming hospital staff for NHS problems. She goes to a hotel to meet her lover, a local businessman named Mark; she is married with teenaged children and a reporter is trying to expose them. An old friend of Mark's, Steve, comes to the hotel looking for a job while a waitress catches a teenager, Robert, trying to get out through the kitchen just before a gas explosion. Steve carries the waitress outside but she later dies. Mark goes back to his room for his briefcase and is buried under rubble on the stairs. Jane is taken to hospital under a false name but Charlie recognises her from a newspaper photo; she explains she wants to be with Mark but is worried about her career and children. Steve gets his former wife and son to come and see him; he was violent towards them and is only allowed supervised access with his son. His former wife is moving away. Steve takes his son and steals a car but later returns both before slipping away. Colette notices Debbie's hotel card in Robert's bag and she confirms he is the mugger. Andrew is leading a team at the hotel and finds Mark is impaled underneath a beam that could collapse. Charlie and Max join them and Jane follows on, with Charlie letting her through. They end up lifting Mark off the pipe just before the roof gives way and Jane accompanies him to the hospital before having to face the press. Guest starring Sandra Dickinson, Marina Sirtis and Shaun Scott
308	24	"Big Mistake"	Brett Fallis	Patrick Melanaphy	3 February 2001	9.14
Patrick is assigned to look after a medical student, Maria. He is clearly attracted to her, prompting a jealous reaction from Holly. Brothers Greig and Michael go for a job interview but Josh and Penny later find Greig has pushed Michael off a bridge during an argument. Greig threatens to throw himself off if Michael dies or if they take him away. Michael dies but Josh stops Greig jumping. At the hospital, he tells his wife that he knows she and Michael had an affair while he was in prison for fraud. She tells him it was only because he wasn't there and she'd chosen him; Greig is arrested. A graphic designer, Paul, takes two people he is hoping to get work from for a meal at a Japanese restaurant and dares them to eat puffer fish with him. One of them does but they end up being poisoned because it wasn't prepared properly: The restaurant owner pocketed most of Paul's money and bought it pre-packaged. Andrew, Patrick and Holly are unaware of the treatment and Maria has to advise them. Paul gets the contract. At the end of the shift, Patrick asks Maria out but learns she is gay. Charlie meets a solicitor about getting custody of Louis and learns it will cost £15,000 and there are no guarantees. Holly gets a teddy bear from her admirer which she bins, but when she goes back to her car, she finds it pinned to the windscreen. Guest starring Michael Cole, Robin Soans, Jamie Glover and Jacqueline King
309	25	"Ambulance Chaser"	Ged Maguire	Len Collin	10 February 2001	9.37
Josh (Ian Bleasdale), Fin (Kwame Kwei-Armah), Barney (Ronnie McCann) and Tom (Kieron Forsyth) must transfer a critical burns patient to another hospital before he dies of his injuries. They get caught in a traffic jam and have to go down a country road. A teenage boy runs out in front of them, causing them to crash and burst a tyre. He tells them his girlfriend is in labour and Fin goes with him while Josh changes the tyre. The ambulance has to leave without Fin but the patient dies en route. Fin discovers the boy's girlfriend is an older woman who was the school librarian; they are in hiding since his parents reported the relationship to the police. Fin delivers the baby after discovering it is a breech birth and convinces the couple he needs checking over at the hospital, even though it will expose them. The boy promises to wait for her if she goes to prison. Guest starring Carolyn Backhouse, Asier Cebeira and David Sargent
310	26	"Scent of the Roses"	Julie Edwards	Susan Boyd	17 February 2001	9.03
Max, Dan and Holly put the major incident exercise into practise, although they are bothered by an over-enthusiastic actor who has a fake blood bag and uses a contact lens to simulate shock. Another actress has dropped her daughter off at a stable; she is injured by a frightened horse and ends up in the hospital, with Mel braving the stable dog to help treat her. Her mother is upset that they have little in common but after advice from Duffy she decides to attend her daughter's show parade. Charlie attends his custody hearing but after being warned that he is risking alienating Baz and losing contact with Louis altogether he drops the suit. A middle-aged security guard finds an old flame destroying clothes in a store in a protest against animal cruelty. He lets her go despite her accidentally splashing him with acid; they are reunited at the hospital and on learning he won't get sick pay he resigns. A man who has just had to leave his job with the forestry commission goes to a garden centre with his deaf teenage daughter; she summons help when he has a stroke and he is expected to recover. Holly finds a rose pinned to her front door and another one on her car, and tells Colette and Chloe she thinks someone was in her room while she was asleep. At the end of the shift, she finds another rose pinned to her locker and even Patrick has to admit the situation is no longer funny. Colette summons Charlie and Andrew after finding Duffy in pain in the toilet, worried she is losing the baby. Guest starring John Duttine, Polly Hemingway and Jacqueline King Note: No more trailers for future episodes
311	27	"Breaking Point"	Tim Leandro	Isabelle Grey	24 February 2001	8.92
Duffy is recovering on a ward; she is still pregnant but doesn't believe Andrew when he says he now wants the baby. Wendy, the widow of a consultant, is brought in after falling down some stairs days ago. Her daughter Heather turns up and Max does a scan which suggests she has cancer. Heather gets talking to Parsons, a teacher with an old leg injury who recalls how the school was sued when a student dropped a computer that he was stealing on his foot. Heather realises he is faking his pain to get compensation and Parsons leaves. Penny tries to warn Colette off Josh and Amy tells Colette about him losing his family. Penny gets a letter from an old friend of her father's with his address. Holly receives a phone call from her stalker. A woman celebrates her birthday by going go-karting with her teenage son. A French exchange student staying with them collapses while they are racing; it turns out he is diabetic. A runner, Joe, comes in after collapsing with chest pains; he had a tracheotomy the previous year. On seeing how overrun the department is, he leaves but collapses in the car park and is found by Dan, who gets him back inside. The ambulances are called out to a major road accident and Charlie tells Dan they will have to close the department if they can't move patients. Dan manages to get two beds cleared in ITU but comes back downstairs to find Charlie has closed the department anyway. Guest starring Diane Holland, Margi Clarke and Elyes Gabel
312	28	"Lost and Found"	Nic Phillips	Simon Moss	3 March 2001	9.25
Max and Patrick manage to revive Joe in Resus and he is taken up to the ward. Dan argues with Charlie about his decision. Fin and Mel pick up a swimmer found drowning in a pool and Fin insists on taking him to Holby. With the extra beds Dan found, Max and Charlie agree to reopen the department and Fin has a go at Charlie for trying to divert them. Chloe and new student nurse Anna Paul look after a woman who fell off a ladder and has just found out she is pregnant. They realise the swimmer is her husband and have to tell her he died in Resus. Amy's childminder Kerry picks up Milo from the hospital. While driving home, she runs over a cyclist who was clearing an obstruction from the road and hits a parked car. She is knocked out when the car explodes and Milo wanders off. Josh and Penny arrive and Josh finds Milo just in time to stop him touching an electric fence. Amy blames Kerry but later apologises. Penny apologises to Colette and gives her and Josh her blessing, while arranging a date with the cyclist. A man with an eye injury who was told to go to St. Thomas' during the closure arouses Holly's paranoia when he flirts with her but the injury turns out to be genuine. Patrick drives Holly home but after he has gone, she finds someone has been in there and filled her house with candles. Guest starring Suzy Cooper, Martin Bradshaw and Don Gilet Anna Paul is introduced
313	29	"Kindness of Strangers"	N.G. Bristow	Suzie Smith	10 March 2001	9.52
Holly comes into work out of sorts after the break-in. When a boy with asthma is brought in, she messes up putting a line in and causes a bleed. Duffy learns Amy is resigning to spend more time with Milo. The boy's father loses his temper with Amy but later apologises. The boy convinces him to offer her a job as his PA. A married woman is reunited with the Russian dancer who she failed to follow home when they were lovers twenty-six years ago. She agrees to leave her husband for him but suffers a stroke and dies in hospital after a second stroke. Her ex-lover simply tells her husband she had a happy life and they both say their goodbyes to her. A man working in stocks and shares learns he has lost millions of pounds. He goes to gas himself in his garage but is disturbed by a tramp who had been sleeping in there. He chases him off and has another go but the tramp returns and save him, being badly cut in the process. The tramp admits his sister committed suicide after he went out with his friends instead of looking after her when she had depression. Holly gets a phone call from her stalker, who is in the hospital, and discovers someone has stolen her photo from the board. Dan supports her and admits he has feelings for her. Patrick offers to drive her home but someone slashes his tyres. Dan asks Tom to take her instead, unaware he has the photo. Guest starring James Buller, Sharon Maughan, Jon Laurimore and Irek Mukhamedov Final Appearance of Amy
314	30	"Only You"	Graham Moore	Chris Ould	17 March 2001	9.39
Tom (Kieron Forsyth) has finally achieved his goal. He's got Holly (Sandra Huggett) alone with him in his house, having convinced her to go back there with him. Dan (Grant Masters) looks into the flowers Holly received and realises Tom sent them. He goes to Tom's house on learning Holly is there but Holly is already suspicious of Dan and Tom manages to drug him. However, Holly is concerned when Tom refuses to phone an ambulance and discovers he has a collage of photos of her, awake and asleep. Tom is convinced she is interested in him since she invited him to the club and becomes aggressive. A semi-conscious Dan staggers in and is pushed down the stairs by Tom, but the distraction allows Holly to knock Tom out with a vase. Tom is arrested and Holly tells Dan she just wants to be friends. Guest starring Gabrielle Gabbitas and Mark Meadows
315	31	"Allied Forces"	Patrick Tucker	Kathrine Smith	24 March 2001	8.82
Holly insists on coming into work the day after her ordeal, only to find the police investigating her on suspicion of assault. However, after talking to the rest of the staff they drop the case and charge Tom. New receptionist Jack Vincent arrives for his first shift and Barney and Anna play a joke on him by getting him to search a bag lady well known to the staff for identification. He gets his own back by giving them charcoal sweets, although Charlie also takes one. Holly wants to send the bag lady home but Colette insists on giving her an ECG and Patrick, who has clashed with Holly throughout the shift, convinces her to go home. A stag, Rob, wakes up to find himself tied to a tree in a field. He is found by farmer's son Davey, who leaves the handbrake off his land rover causing it to trap them both against the tree. Farmer Len tries to move the vehicle but crushes Rob's foot. Josh and Penny get them all to the hospital where Max realises Rob's foot will have to be amputated, although Anna can't bring herself to break the news and gives him false hope. Len and Davey argue over the farm so Rob, a management consultant, gives them advice. Rob's fiancé tells him she still loves him but doesn't want the fuss of a wedding. Max offers Andrew a permanent consultant's post when Broadway reopens but he turns it down, feeling working together has hurt his and Duffy's marriage. Sisters Kim and Tracey turn up after being in a fight with their stepmother Danielle, who is the same age as them and who they view as a gold-digger; they were trying to plan a retirement party for their father but Danielle wants the two of them to go away abroad to mark it. They soften slightly when they learn Danielle is pregnant but also point out it means she can't travel. Josh arranges to go round Colette's for dinner but leaves when her mother shows up unexpectedly. Guest starring Kathleen Worth, Dallas Campbell, Peter Martin and Ray Armstrong Jack Vincent is introduced
316	32	"Heroes and Villains"	Paul Duane	Carolyn Sally Jones	31 March 2001	8.38
Dan meets with Etheridge, a retired consultant who he is hoping will donate money to the hospital. Patrick and Etheridge rub each other up the one way. A young woman who is about to get married while doing a skydive despite having recently given birth comes in with stomach pains. Etheridge suspects part of the placenta is still lodged inside her but she leaves before getting the results. She collapses before doing the drive and Etheridge's diagnosis turns out to be correct. He agrees to donate the money and also convinces Patrick to clear the air with Dan. A man argues with his wife and smashes a window in anger, cutting his arm, before locking her out of the house. She calls an ambulance and Josh and Penny arrive to find he has turned all the gas on and is brandishing a lighter; fortunately, he is overpowered before it can ignite. He explains he recently learned his son isn't his. The son collapses while fishing with a friend; he is in renal failure and needs a transplant. His presumed father was being tested as a donor and learns that, even though he isn't the father, he is a match and gladly agrees to donate. Colette is angry that Josh was put in danger and they share a kiss. Duffy is about to leave on maternity leave and has convinced Andrew to take the permanent job. Jack and Barney play a prank on Anna by sending her out on a fake call-out and then having her marooned in full gear, but she gets a lift back from a policeman and goes for a drink with him. Penny meets her half-brother Luke, who fills her in on the outdoor pursuit centre their father Gordon runs. However, she then receives a letter from Gordon saying he doesn't want to see her. Guest starring Frank Thornton, Jonathan Magnanti and Andrina Carroll
317	33	"The Long Road Home"	Alan Wareing	Jeff Povey	7 April 2001	8.85
Chloe asks Barney to join her at a wrestling match that she is on duty at. The club owner is in debt and tries to blackmail a wrestler who he knows is cheating on his wife to throw the match, but he accidentally wins. Chloe finds Louise, a woman with arthritis and lung troubles who is there with her young friend Janine, trying to retrieve her wedding ring in the toilet. She explains that Janine used to be her cleaner but moved in when Louise's husband died; she suspects she is mainly after her money. At the wrestler's suggestion, the club owner fakes a power cut to get everyone out then starts a fire in his office. Chloe and Louise are trapped by the flames but rescued by Barney. The club owner is arrested. At the hospital, Louise gets a chaplain to witness her new will and tells Janine she has cut her out before deteriorating and being rushed into Resus. Barney takes Chloe back to her flat and they sleep together. Fin accompanies Penny to see Gordon. Two of the lads from his centre go for a joy ride in Fin's car and one of them is injured when his foot is trapped in the moving vehicle; Fin and Penny look after him until the ambulance arrives. Gordon explains he was about to split from Penny's mum when she found out she was pregnant. He nearly hit her so moved abroad and re-married: He is now divorced from Luke's mum and was unaware Penny's mother had died. Fin and Luke convince him to ask her to stay on. Guest starring Hugh Quarshie, Jason Colbert and Will Barton
318	34	"Mix and Match"	Paul Murton	Chris Webb	14 April 2001	8.64
A mixed race boy is brought in with facial injuries by his black father, who is bitter about his wife leaving him for a white man. Andrew notes the burns have been caused by bleach but Holly and Colette think it has been rubbed in. The boy admits he was trying to make himself white so his mother would love him and his father agrees to take him to see his mother. Charlie returns from Canada: He has sold his house and is planning to move into a bachelor pad but finds the flat has been rented to someone else, so Max invites him to stay with him. Chloe and Barney are awkward after their night together and decide to stay friends. Charlie tells them Louisa suffered a stroke and Janine later visits to tell them she died. Chloe learns she is the sole beneficiary of Louisa's will and has inherited her house. A model learns her best friend's boyfriend is planning to break up with her. The friend is jealous of the pair and pushes the model through a glass panel, leaving her with a permanent facial injury, although she promises to stand by her afterwards. A woman receives romantic advances from her dance partner but leaves him when her husband suffers a heart attack and decides to give up the dancing. Colette is visited by her mother, who says the daughter she forced Colette to give up sixteen years ago wants to meet her. Guest starring Roger Griffiths, Dominick Baron and Carla Henry
319	35	"Breaking the Spell – Part One"	Tim Leandro	Katharine Way	21 April 2001	8.24
Charlie interrupts Max asking Amanda to move in with him, although Max tells him he can stay until he finds somewhere else. Josh gives Penny a watch on her last day. A counsellor, Ed, calls an ambulance to one of his clients, Graham, who has been stabbed. Graham dies in hospital. Patrick and Holly were at med school with Ed and Holly dated him before Patrick. Ed took a drug overdose and Patrick saved him but he was thrown out. Ed claimed Patrick reported him, which was what broke up him and Holly. Chloe is paying off her debts even though she has yet to get the money through from Louisa's will. She has got a loan to cover it and bought a house boat. Janine comes in and says she is contesting the will: Since Louisa died less than twelve hours after making it, legally she was not of sound mind. A teenager, Kaz, is brought in who has terminal leukaemia. She asks Barney to kiss her because no-one ever has but he refuses. Jack later grants her wish, revealing his sister died of leukaemia the day she was meant to take a balloon trip. Anna pays a prank on Jack, convincing him a friend is offering money for empty crisp packets so he spends the shift eating them. Liz, a schoolgirl who is living rough, is bullied by classmates Emma and Sonia. She sabotages Sonia's easel so it catches fire. Emma follows Liz to the cave where she is living. Emma fits her head during a scuffle and Liz runs off. Colette is visited by Natalie, the daughter she gave up for adoption, who is resentful towards her. When Holly (Sandra Huggett) hears her car alarm going off, she goes outside to investigate – discovering that the glass has been smashed and Tom is right behind her... Guest starring Simon Merrells, Claire Huckle and Danielle McCormack
320	36	"Breaking the Spell – Part Two"	Tim Leandro	Katharine Way	28 April 2001	9.95
Tom (Kieron Forsyth) has kidnapped Holly (Sandra Huggett) and is holding her in a disused area of the hospital. Patrick (Ian Kelsey) realises she is missing and confronts Ed but quickly realises he isn't involved and learns Tom is out on bail. He, Dan (Grant Masters) and Spencer (Ben Keaton) see Tom on CCTV. Colette speaks with Natalie but she leaves upset when Colette fails to introduce her properly to Penny. However, they later talks again and Colette explains about her to Josh. Liz fetches Fin and Mel to help Emma, who has a pneumothorax. Liz refuses to join Emma's gang, just wanting her to stop bullying her. Recently widowed Peter is brought in with a suspected heart attack and asks not to be resuscitated. His son Stuart, who has just been released from prison for fraud, threatens the staff with retribution and Charlie orders him revived. Peter is grateful of the opportunity to reconnect with Stuart. Janine makes a complaint to Dan about Chloe. Tom encounters Andrew (Philip Bretherton) in the car park and pushes him down some steps. He is eventually found but dies in Resus and Charlie has to break the news to Duffy. Tom is intending to kill Holly in a murder-suicide but she breaks a window, attracting Patrick and Dan's attention, just before he injects her. Patrick manages to revive her and Dan chases Tom, who falls to his death from a balcony. Guest starring Simon Merrells, Danielle McCormack and Claire Huckle Final appearances of Anaesthetist Tom Harvey, Locum Consultant Andrew Bower, Staff Nurse Barney Woolfe (Ronnie McCann), Paramedics Penny Hutchens (Donna Alexander) and Melanie Dyson (Michelle Butterly), Directorate Manager Dan Robinson and SHO Holly Miles. The full script for the episode can be read on the BBC website.
