= Animal Avengers =

Animal Avengers may refer to:

- Animal Avengers, a charity founded by Shannon Elizabeth and Joseph D. Reitman
- Animal Avengers (novel), by Malorie Blackman
