= Noughts + Crosses =

British television alternative history drama series (2020 & 2022)

- Genre: Alternative history; Drama
- Based on: Noughts & Crosses by Malorie Blackman
- Written by: Lydia Adetunji; Nathaniel Price; Rachel De-lahay; Benji Walters; Jerome Bucchan-Nelson
- Directed by: Julian Holmes; Koby Adom; Kibwe Tavares
- Starring: Jack Rowan; Masali Baduza
- Country of origin: United Kingdom
- Original language: English
- No. of series: 2
- No. of episodes: 10

Production
- Producer: Johann Knobel
- Production location: South Africa
- Production companies: Mammoth Screen; Participant; Roc Nation

Original release
- Network: BBC One
- Release: 5 March 2020 – 17 May 2022

Noughts + Crosses is a British drama television series based on the Noughts & Crosses novel series by Malorie Blackman. The series is set in an alternative history where black "Cross" people rule over white "Noughts". The first episode aired on BBC One on 5 March 2020, and the remaining episodes premiered on BBC iPlayer on the same day. In May 2021, the BBC announced that a second series had been commissioned.

== Synopsis ==
The BBC synopsis reads: "Against a background of prejudice, distrust and powerful rebellion mounting on the streets, a passionate romance builds between Sephy and Callum which will lead them both into terrible danger".

== Setting ==
The series takes place in present-day London in an alternative history where, 700 years prior, several nations in what is presently West Africa combined to form the powerful African Empire and went on to colonise Europe. After a conflict known as the Great World War, control of Europe is split between different African factions, with mainland Europe under control of the Malian Empire and the Moors, whereas Albion (comprising Great Britain and Ireland) and parts of Scandinavia remain under the thumb of the African Empire.

Russia and the Balkans remain in active conflict with the African colonisers, although since the Great World War their national borders have been pushed back. The Ottoman Empire also exists, still controlling parts of Middle East.

Albion appears to be a self-governing colony with its own (Cross) Prime Minister and executive leadership, an exclusively Cross police force, and a military only just opened up to a small number of Nought high-achievers. However, it is still accountable to the African Empire based on the African continent. As of 1950, racial segregation is rigidly enforced in the colony between those of wealthy African descent (known as Crosses or daggers) and the poorer native Europeans (known as Noughts or blankers).

== Cast and characters ==
=== Main ===
- Masali Baduza as Persephone "Sephy" Hadley, the daughter of a Cross politician and childhood friend of Callum
- Jack Rowan as Callum McGregor, one of the first Nought army cadets at Mercy Point and a childhood friend of Sephy
- Helen Baxendale as Meggie McGregor, Callum and Jude's mother and a housekeeper for the Hadley family
- Paterson Joseph as Home Secretary Kamal Hadley
- Josh Dylan as Jude McGregor, Callum's militant older brother
- Shaun Dingwall as Jack Dorn, leader of the Liberation Militia
- Jonathan Ajayi as Lieutenant Lekan Baako, a military officer and Sephy's boyfriend
- Kiké Brimah as Minerva Hadley, Sephy's older sister
- Rakie Ayola as Prime Minister Opal Folami
- Bonnie Mbuli as Jasmine Hadley, Kamal's wife and Sephy and Minerva's mother
- Ian Hart as Ryan McGregor, Callum and Jude's father and a former militant activist (season 1)

=== Recurring ===
- Jodie Tyack as Elaine Sawyer, a Nought cadet at Mercy Point
- Michael Dapaah as Mensah (season 2)
- Judi Love as Chidi (season 2)
- Nathaniel Ramabulana as Sergeant Major Bolade Oluade, Callum's commanding officer at Mercy Point
- Jasmine Jobson as Cara (season 2)
- Nicholas Beveney as Police Deputy Commissioner Folu Abiola
- Robert Hands as Clem (season 2)
- Stormzy as Kolawale, Editor-in-Chief of the Ohene Standard
- Jack Bandeira as Carl (season 1)
- Luke Bailey as Yaro Baloyi-Hadley, Kamal's illegitimate mixed race son
- Eunice Olumide as Omotola Aguda, a news anchor for CAN
- Ore Oduba as Obiora Akintola, a news anchor for CAN
- Kagiso Rathebe as Chidike Akindele (season 1)

== Episodes ==
Series	Episodes	Originally released (UK)		Ave. UK viewers (millions)	Ave. US viewers (millions)
Series	Episodes	First released	Last released	Ave. UK viewers (millions)	Ave. US viewers (millions)
1	6	5 March 2020	9 April 2020	7.063	0.423
2	4	26 April 2022	17 May 2022	4.923	0.246

=== Series 1 (2020) ===
No.	Title	Directed by	Written by	Original release date	U.K. viewers (millions)
1	"Episode 1"	Julian Holmes	Lydia Adetunji	5 March 2020	3.75
In London, Cross police officers break up a Nought party. A Nought youth Danny is badly wounded after being beaten by Cross cops for resisting arrest. Callum McGregor is applying for a place at the prestigious Mercy Cross military academy. His mother Meggie works as a housekeeper for the Hadley family, a wealthy Cross family. Kamal Hadley is the Home Minister and advocates tougher measures including strip searches in response to ethnic tensions. His liberal-minded daughter "Sephy" is a political science undergraduate who is sympathetic to the plight of the Noughts. While Callum is working as a servant at a Hadley dinner function, he rekindles his relationship with his childhood friend Sephy. Radical Nought youth stage a vigil outside the Nought youth's hospital, which turns violent. Callum and Sephy are attacked by several Nought youth. Sephy calls the Noughts "Blankers", a derogatory term which upsets Callum. Sephy apologizes and Callum accepts but doesn't forgive her. Their friendship blossoms into a romantic relationship. Callum's older brother Jude becomes involved with the revived Liberation Militia, whose leader Jack Dorn murders Callum's badly wounded Nought friend Danny in hospital in order to stoke ethnic tensions between Noughts and Crosses.
2	"Episode 2"	Julian Holmes	Lydia Adetunji	12 March 2020	<(3.72)
Callum and Elaine Sawyer get a place as cadets at Mercy Point Academy but endure intense racism and hostility from the Cross cadets and faculty. Home Minister Kamal Hadley gives an inaugural speech at the Academy advocating "unity in difference," a veiled rejection of interracial relationships. Liberation Militia leader Jack Dorn is later arrested in a police raid but strikes a deal with Kamal to foment terrorism and ethnic tensions in order to undermine Prime Minister Opal Folami's leadership. While on leave, Callum continues his romantic relationship with Sephy, which arouses the jealousy of her ex boyfriend and military cadet Lekan Baako, who assaults several interracial couples at a Cross hotel. Meanwhile, Callum's father Ryan is dismissed from his warehouse job by his boss, who is a successful Nought businessman, after filling in for the father of Danny who attended his son's funeral.
3	"Episode 3"	Julian Holmes	Lydia Adetunji	19 March 2020	<(4.61)
Callum and Elaine continue their training at Mercy Point Academy while the liberal-minded Sephy challenges the race-based orthodoxy, placing her at odds with her professor and father Kamal. Jasmine confides about her estranged relationship with her husband and affairs to Meggie, who raises the issue with Kamal. Enraged that Meggie has shared her secrets, Jasmine dismisses her. As consolation, Kamal secretly provides two years' of wages to Meggie in return for not disclosing their family problems. Jasmine is later hospitalised following a suicide attempt. Angered by the Crosses' treatment of his wife, Ryan joins the Liberation Militia, who are plotting an attack during the annual Nought holiday May Day. Callum, Elaine and their fellow cadets are posted as security details at May Day. After a Nought crowd including Jude confronts the cadets, Callum refuses to shoot his kinsmen and leaves the military academy. Amidst the troubles, Callum and Sephy continue their relationship but are caught up in a bomb attack at Demwa Hospital.
4	"Episode 4"	Koby Adom	Nathaniel Price	26 March 2020	<(4.93)
Following the bombing of Demwa Hospital which killed three people, Callum and Jude are arrested on suspicion of the bomb attack based on information from Sephy. To save them, Ryan confesses to the bomb attack. With Ryan facing the death penalty, Sephy and Jasmine fund Ryan's defence, providing him with a skilled lawyer who manages to get the death penalty downgraded to a 30-year custodial sentence. Callum reconciles with Sephy, with Meggie coming to accept it. Meanwhile, Kamal meets with his illegitimate mixed-race son Yaro Baryoli-Hadley, offering him 20,000 dollars to keep his silence. Yaro is bitter that Kamal abandoned his mother. Following the bomb attack, Prime Minister Folami, who had proposed decriminalising interracial relations, resigns and Kamal is designated as interim Prime Minister. Kamal learns from Lekan about Sephy's relationship with Callum. In prison, Ryan is brutally beaten up by a Cross inmate while the guard stands by. Jack Dorn and the Liberation Militia prepare for war with the Cross government.
5	"Episode 5"	Koby Adom	Nathaniel Price	2 April 2020	<(4.35)
The McGregors learn about the death of Ryan in prison but are distraught at not being able to see his body. The Cross authorities claim it was a suicide but Jude and Callum believe otherwise. The McGregors' angst is made worse when the family is charged an invoice for the disposal of Ryan's body. Following his inauguration, Prime Minister Kamal Hadley rescinds his predecessor's attempts at racial integration. Kamal warns Callum to stay away from his daughter, objecting to their interracial relationship. Callum's anger at his father's death and seeing Sephy hug Lekan lead him to accept Jude's invitation to join the Liberation Militia. Callum confronts the guard who guarded his father, who confirms that Kamal ordered his death. Jack arrives and kills the guard. Meanwhile, Sephy grows increasingly estranged from her father Kamal after learning about his treatment of his illegitimate son Yaro and his role in Ryan's death. Sephy tries to reconnect with Callum but he has committed himself to the Liberation Militia.
6	"Episode 6"	Koby Adom	Rachel De-lahay	9 April 2020	<(4.12)
Several masked Liberation Militia leaders including Callum and Jude attack the offices of the conservative Ohene Standard newspaper as part of their resistance campaign against Cross rule. Yaro goes to the media, seeking to expose Prime Minister Kamal Hadley as his father. However, Hadley convinces the Ohene Standard's editor to run a smear campaign attacking Yaro for his purported terrorist links. As Sephy grows estranged from her father, she spends more time with Meggie and Jasmine, the latter of whom is angry with Kamal for his affairs. Under Jack's leadership, the Liberation Militia kidnaps Sephy, demanding a $1 million ransom and Kamal's resignation. Tasked with guarding Sephy, Callum is initially sullen and hostile to his former Cross girlfriend. However, the two reconcile after he learns that Sephy is pregnant with their child. Kamal resigns and meets with Jack to deliver the $1 million ransom. Jack takes the ransom but reneges on the deal and orders that Sephy be killed. Experiencing a change of heart, Jude fights with Jack, allowing Callum and Sephy to escape. They encounter Kamal but Sephy convinces her father to spare Callum. Sephy and Callum escape to live together as a couple on the run.

=== Series 2 (2022) ===
No.	Title	Directed by	Written by	Original release date	U.K. viewers (millions)
1	"Episode 1"	Koby Adom	Lydia Adetunji	26 April 2022	3.75
On the run, Callum and Sephy have found a safe haven in the woods. But when their peace is disturbed by an unexpected visitor, they must go to London to gather the resources they need to leave Albion for good. Back in London, Sephy’s disappearance is spurring vigilante attacks, and hate crime against Noughts is on the rise. Wanted by the police for terrorism, and by the Ofa Brotherhood for his role in Sephy’s kidnap, Jude hides out in an office block. But when he unexpectedly meets Cara, who has both Cross and Nought heritage, things get off on the wrong foot.
2	"Episode 2"	Koby Adom	Lydia Adetunji & Benji Walters	3 May 2022	<(3.72)
Out of options, Callum goes back to the Liberation Militia looking for a way to Muscovy, and Sephy goes back to Kamal looking for absolution in Albion. But both require sacrifices.
3	"Episode 3"	Koby Adom	Jerome Bucchan-Nelson	10 May 2022	<(4.61)
With Sephy’s explosive interview buying the couple some time, Callum and Sephy settle into Jasmine’s second home. But Jasmine fears she could lose Sephy again and wonders whether Sephy has already lost herself in her relationship with Callum.
4	"Episode 4"	Koby Adom	Lydia Adetunji	17 May 2022	<(4.93)
Callum’s life hangs in the balance as he awaits his day in court. Sephy works tirelessly to clear Callum’s name, and Jude hatches a plan to break him out of prison.

== Production ==
In 2016, the BBC announced they were producing an adaptation, to be written by Levi David Addai and Matthew Graham. They had to bow out and Toby Whithouse took over in 2018. Jay Z's company Roc Nation and Participant Media co-produced the series. In November 2018, it was announced Jack Rowan and Masali Baduza were cast as Callum McGregor and Sephy Hadley respectively.

Filming for the series began in November 2018 in South Africa.

On 18 May 2021, the BBC announced that a second series had been commissioned.

== Distribution ==
In New Zealand, the series is available on the free streaming service TVNZ On Demand, while in Australia it was first screened on pay television channel BBC First in September 2020 and is also distributed by Foxtel on their platform. The series premiered on ABC Television in November 2021, and became available on their free streaming platform, ABC iview.

The series was added to the Peacock streaming service in the United States in September 2020. The series is streaming on SonyLIV in India. In Hungary, the series is available on HBO GO.

== Soundtrack ==
The soundtrack, titled Noughts + Crosses: The Soundtrack, was released on BBC Sounds on 10 February 2020, without track one being available.

No.	Title	Artist	Length
1.	"Noughts + Crosses Theme"	Matthew Herbert
2.	"Summon The Fire"	The Comet Is Coming
3.	"Boombaya"	Boombaya
4.	"Disco Dancer"	Kiki Gyan
5.	"Seven Churches For St Jude"	Gaika
6.	"Soubour"	Songhoy Blues
7.	"Heaven"	Ebo Taylor
8.	"Challenge (To Be Continued)"	Jlin
9.	"Don Do"	Fatoumata Diawara
10.	"Plastic 100°C"	Sampha
11.	"I've Been Thinking (feat. Cat Power)"	Handsome Boy Modeling School
12.	"Listen To My Son"	Darondo
13.	"Afro Blue"	Melanie De Biasio
14.	"Living Dangerously (feat. Kyla Phil)"	Umlilo
15.	"Remembering Mountains"	Sharon Van Etten
16.	"Lord I Just Can't Keep From Crying Sometimes"	Colin Stetson
17.	"Philakanzima"	Bongeziwe Mabandla
18.	"Without You (feat. Kerry Leatham)"	Lapalux
19.	"Ghetto Ghetto"	Diron Animal
20.	"Where You Are (feat. Jono McCleery)"	Portico Quartet
21.	"Imoto"	Mlindo The Vocalist
22.	"Love Family"	Diron Animal
23.	"Let's Go (The Royal We)"	Run The Jewels
Total length:			1:41:00

== Reception ==
=== Series 1 ===
The Guardian's Josh Lee gave the first series four out of five stars, describing it as a "reverse-race love story that is vital viewing." Lee praised the series for highlighting the challenges that working-class white people and people of colour share in the real world through its depiction of racism in an alternative world dominated by African supremacy.

=== Series 2 ===
The Guardian's Jack Seale gave the second series two out of five stars, remarking that the show's aim to "be a chilling fable, a talking point, a shaming call to action" was undercut by confused priorities as an adaptation, explaining, "It airs late and features too much swearing, violence and politics for a young audience, while perhaps not being brutal enough for an adult saga with such a strong premise.".

== See also ==
- Fable, a 1965 BBC television play by John Hopkins about flipped racial dynamics.
- BabaKiueria, a 1986 Australian mockumentary about an oppressed white minority in a society dominated by Aboriginal Australians.
- White Man's Burden, a 1995 American film about similar subject matter.
