= Cloud Busting =

2004 children's book by Malorie Blackman

- Author: Malorie Blackman
- Language: British English
- Genre: Children's
- Publisher: Doubleday
- Publication date: 2 September 2004
- Publication place: United Kingdom
- Pages: 146 pp
- ISBN: 978-0-385-60796-4
- OCLC: 56642254
- LC Class: PZ7.B532337 Clo 2004

Cloud Busting is a 2004 children's novel by Malorie Blackman. It is written in verse, with each chapter using a different type of poetry.

The novel won the Nestlé Children's Book Prize Silver Award and was longlisted for the Carnegie Medal.

== Plot ==
Mr Mackie, the teacher, assigns the homework to the class: to write a poem. Sam wants to write his poem about Davey. Alex, his ex-best friend, mocks him for doing so. Sam quotes: "I want to write my poem about Davey. Because now he's gone And I can't get him out of my head!"

Davey, or 'Fizzy Feet', is a new boy. Everyone hates him. He has holes in his jumper, and strange ideas fill his mind. Sam, the school bully, makes fun of him. He dislikes Davey at least as much as everyone else until Davey saves his life by pulling him from in front of a speeding vehicle. The two soon become friends.

Davey's way of looking at life begins to seem fun. Sam learns that Davey has an allergy to peanuts, and Davey tells him to keep it a secret to avoid a fuss. In front of the bully, Alex, he accidentally lets it slip. Alex, as a joke, offers Davey a part of his sandwich, with two peanuts slipped inside. Davey immediately has an allergic reaction, and Mr Mackie is forced to use the epipen. Davey regains consciousness and is whisked to hospital. Davey begins to avoid Sam after letting his secret slip. He loses his eccentric imagination.

The narrative concludes with Davey and Sam returning to the park for Cloud Busting, publicly reconciling and re-establishing their friendship.

What actually happened was Sam Cloud Busting alone. Davey, telling no one, slipped away and left Sam alone thinking hard.
