= Masali Baduza =

South African actress (born 1996)

Masali Baduza (born 12 March 1996) is a South African actress. On television, she is known for her roles as Sephy Hadley in the BBC drama Noughts + Crosses (2020–2022) and as Michaela Stirling in the Netflix period drama Bridgerton (2024–).

== Early life ==
Baduza was born in East London, Eastern Cape, South Africa. She's the youngest of five children; her father worked as a journalist and her mother as a government employee. After high school, Baduza moved to the United States to study at the New York Film Academy in the Los Angeles campus, graduating in 2016 with an Associate of Fine Arts in Acting for Film. After graduation, she returned to South Africa, where she worked primarily in theatre. Baduza is bilingual in Xhosa and English.

== Career ==
Baduza began her career primarily in theatre in South Africa, including an all-female production of The Taming of the Shrew at the Maynardville Open-Air Theatre. She later appeared in the South African crime thriller Trackers, which was M-Net's top performing show for 2019. In 2019, she was named a rising star and one to watch by the Royal Television Society. In 2020 she landed her first work outside of South Africa, playing the character Sephy Hadley in the BBC One drama Noughts + Crosses.

Her film work includes Slumber Party Massacre (2021) and The Woman King (2022).

In 2024, she guest-starred in the third season of Bridgerton as Michaela Stirling, a genderflipped version of the book character Michael Stirling. She appeared as a regular cast member in the fourth season and was later confirmed as one of the leads for the fifth season playing the love interest of Francesca Bridgerton, portrayed by Hannah Dodd, making them the first same-gender central romance of the series.

== Filmography ==
=== Film ===
Year	Title	Character	Notes
2019	Bhai's Cafe	Thandi	
2019	The Fighter	Lerato	Short film
2021	Slumber Party Massacre	Young Trish Deveraux	
2022	The Woman King	Fumbe	
2025	Love and Wine	Amahle	

=== Television ===
Year	Title	Character	Notes
2019	Trackers	Thandi Makebe	3 episodes
2020–2022	Noughts + Crosses	Sephy Hadley	Main role
2024–present	Bridgerton	Michaela Stirling	Main role (season 5); recurring (seasons 3–4)
2024	The Morning After	Winnie	6 episodes
