= Patrick Spiller =

Fictional character from Casualty and Holby City

- Casualty character
- Ian Kelsey as Patrick Spiller
- First appearance: "Free Fall"; 11 December 1999
- Last appearance: "Past, Present, Future"; 16 March 2002
- Portrayed by: Ian Kelsey
- Spinoff(s): Holby City, 2001

In-universe information
- Occupation: Specialist registrar, emergency medicine
- Family: Gordon Spiller (father)
- Significant others: Holly Miles; Rachel James; Lara Stone

Patrick Spiller is a fictional character from the BBC medical drama Casualty, portrayed by actor Ian Kelsey. The character made his first appearance during the fourteenth series episode "Free Fall", which was broadcast on 11 December 1999. Patrick is a specialist registrar in the Holby City Hospital emergency department, who attempts to advance his career and attain a consultancy post, whilst having relationships throughout his tenure with SHO Holly Miles, PC Rachel James and Holly's replacement, SHO Lara Stone. He dies from a head injury following a car crash in the sixteenth series episode "Past, Present, Future" – making his final appearance on 16 March 2002.

== Characterisation and development ==
Kelsey admitted that he was not confident with the medical jargon that he had to say, likening it to learning Russian. He said "I haven't a clue what I'm talking about, but there's an adviser who makes sure we don't point at a patient's nose when we're talking about their feet. I'll have to start writing my lines on the patients' plaster casts."

Patrick has been described as "Casualty's bad boy" by Marion McMullen of the Coventry Telegraph, who deemed him "arrogant, brusque and bad-tempered". Kelsey has disclosed that viewers of the show sometimes assume that he shares his character's temperament, but that he does not receive any hostility for it, surmising: "It must mean I'm somehow putting across the fact that there really is a nice bloke behind the brick wall that Patrick puts up." Kelsey feels that the only trait of Patrick's which he shares is his "dry sense of humour". He has assessed that Patrick is "very good" at his job, but that his bedside manner becomes worse as the series develops. He has stated, however, that: "Away from the eyes of his colleagues he is perfectly capable of showing real humanity and care." Kelsey believes that Patrick softened in the show's fifteenth series, but that he reverted to form "with a vengeance" in series sixteen. He believes that Patrick would be spoiled for the show's viewers if it was ever explained why he behaves the way he does, and prefers playing Patrick as the "bad guy".

Writers created a fictional backstory for Patrick and Senior House Officer Holly Miles (Sandra Huggett), which is revealed when they meet again. The characters had "a fling" while they were at college together, and Kelsey said that they still fancy each other, so there is a lot of tension. He also expected there would be kissing scenes between them in the future.

Discussing Patrick's relationship with PC Rachel James, Kelsey assessed: "Spiller and Rachel just fancy each other - it's all about sex." SHO Lara Stone was introduced as a love-interest for Patrick. Christine Stephen-Daly, who plays Lara, has commented that Patrick is Lara's type, but that they clash often as they are so similar, asserting that they are both: "arrogant, like getting their own way and enjoy being in control." Stephen-Daly feels that Lara is more "caring" than Patrick, whose bedside manner "leaves a lot to be desired."

In an interview with Inside Soap, Kelsey revealed he took Patrick's coffin plaque, which is hung in his bathroom underneath the coffin plaque of his Emmerdale character, Dave Glover. He added he had "got a nice set now!"

== Storylines ==
Patrick arrives at Holby City Hospital as the emergency department's new senior registrar. He discovers he is working alongside SHO Holly Miles (Sandra Huggett), who he previously dated. In an attempt to get to know Holly again, he asks her out for a drink on her birthday, but she turns him down. Patrick has an arrogant attitude, which leads to staff nurse Lisa Duffin (Cathy Shipton) reprimanding him, and sees him invited to work a shift with the paramedics after dismissing their importance.

When Patrick and Holly become stranded in the snow after Christmas lunch, Patrick reveals that he hates Christmas as his mother died on Christmas Day. He and hospital porter Spencer (Ben Keaton) are held hostage when they become involved in a family feud, but manage to escape unharmed. Patrick grows increasingly concerned for Holly when someone begins stalking her. He offers to give her a lift home after a shift, only to discover his tires have been slashed. Holly is escorted home instead by anaesthetist Tom Harvey (Kieron Forsyth), who is revealed to be her stalker. Holly is later kidnapped by Tom, and Patrick helps to find her.

Holly leaves following her ordeal, and Patrick begins dating married policewoman Rachel James (Amy Robbins). He shows an interest in the department's new SHO Lara Stone, who invites him to a Halloween party, but stands him up upon learning that he is already in a relationship. Patrick is turned down for a consultancy post due to his lack of people skills. Rachel dies after being mugged whilst on patrol. Her husband discovers her infidelity and attacks Patrick, attempting to drown him. Lara finds Patrick unconscious and resuscitates him, leaving her boyfriend to stay by Patrick's bedside as he recovers. When Patrick discovers he has been successful in his application for a consultancy in London, he takes Lara on a date to celebrate. Lara is annoyed when Patrick asks her to join him in London. He later proposes to her, but she turns him down.

Patrick is involved in a motorway accident, saving six school children from a minibus before being rescued. He and Lara have dinner at a restaurant afterwards, and Patrick decides to turn the position in London down and remain in Holby with Lara. He proposes once more, and this time Lara accepts. Still in shock from the accident, Patrick feels dizzy and collapses. He dies from an intercranial bleed caused by the crash. Lara does not attend his funeral, but later breaks into the crematorium to say goodbye to him.

== Reception ==
Charlie Catchpole of the Daily Mirror was keen to see a television doctor who did not like people and cited Patrick as an example. Catchpole wrote, "he's selfish, cruel, bad-tempered, thick-skinned, homophobic and misogynistic. Just wait till we discover what his bad points are." A reporter for Daily Record noted that Patrick had a "lack of charm", which got him in trouble.
