= Malorie Blackman =

British writer (born 1962)

Dame Malorie Blackman DBE FRSL
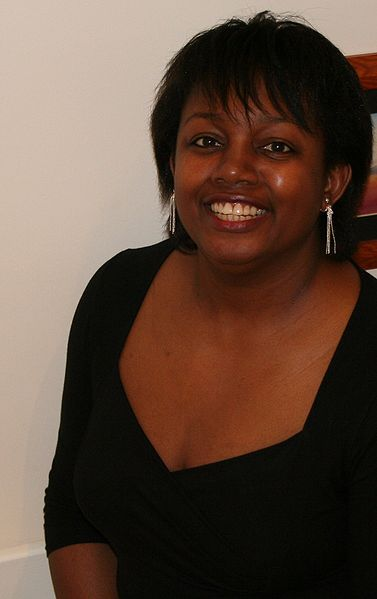
- Born: Oneta Malorie Blackman; 8 January 1962 (age 64); Merton, London, England
- Education: Thames Polytechnic; National Film and Television School
- Occupation: Author
- Writing career
- Genres: Children's literature, science fiction, mystery, thriller and horror; poetry
- Notable work: The Noughts and Crosses series
- Notable awards: Eleanor Farjeon Award, 2005; PEN Pinter Prize, 2022
- Website: www.malorieblackman.co.uk

Dame Oneta Malorie Blackman DBE FRSL (born 8 February 1962) is a British writer who held the position of Children's Laureate from 2013 to 2015. She primarily writes literature and television drama for children and young adults. She has used science fiction to explore social and ethical issues, for example, her Noughts and Crosses series uses the setting of a fictional alternative Britain to explore racism. Blackman has been the recipient of many honours for her work, including the 2022 PEN Pinter Prize. She was made a dame in the King's 2026 Birthday Honours, for services to literature.

== Early life and education ==
Malorie Blackman was born on 8 February 1962 in Merton, London, England, and she grew up in Lewisham, one of five siblings. Her parents were both from Barbados and had come to Britain as part of the "Windrush generation"; her father Joe was a bus driver and her mother Ruby worked in a pyjama factory. Blackman's father walked out on the family while she was young, leaving her mother to single-handedly raise her and her siblings. At school, Malorie wanted to be an English teacher, but she grew up to become a systems programmer instead.

She earned an HNC at Thames Polytechnic and is a graduate of the National Film and Television School.

Since the 1980s, Blackman began attending various courses at City Lit adult education college, and in 2019, City Lit announced the Malorie Blackman OBE "Unheard Voices" Creative Writing Scholarships, providing three annual awards worth up to £1000 each to fund study within the City Lit Creative Writing department.

== Career ==
Blackman's first book was Not So Stupid!, a collection of horror and science fiction stories for young adults, published in November 1990. Since then, she has written more than 60 children's books, including novels and short-story collections, and also television scripts and a stage play. She also became the first person of colour writer to work on Doctor Who in 2018.

Blackman's award-winning Noughts & Crosses series (beginning in 2001), exploring love, racism, and violence, is set in a fictional alternative Britain. Explaining her choice of title, in a 2007 interview for the BBC's Blast website, Blackman said that noughts and crosses is "one of those games that nobody ever plays after childhood, because nobody ever wins". In an interview for The Times, Blackman said that before writing Noughts & Crosses, her protagonists' ethnicities had never been central to the plots of her books. She has also said: "I wanted to show black children just getting on with their lives, having adventures, and solving their dilemmas, like the characters in all the books I read as a child."

Blackman eventually decided to address racism directly. She reused some details from her own experience, including an occasion when she needed a plaster and found they were designed to be inconspicuous only on white people's skin. The Times interviewer Amanda Craig speculated about the delay for the Noughts & Crosses series to be published in the United States: "though there was considerable interest, 9/11 killed off the possibility of publishing any book describing what might drive someone to become a terrorist". Noughts and Crosses later became available in the US, published under the title Black & White (Simon & Schuster Publishers, 2005).

Noughts & Crosses was No. 61 on the Big Read list, a 2003 BBC survey to find "The Nation's Best-Loved Book".

== Recognition and awards ==
Blackman was appointed Officer of the Order of the British Empire (OBE) in the 2008 Birthday Honours. She was elected a Fellow of the Royal Society of Literature in 2009.

Her work has won more than 15 awards. Blackman's television scripts include episodes of the long-running children's drama Byker Grove as well as television adaptations of her novels Whizziwig and Pig-Heart Boy. Her books have been translated into more than 15 languages, including Spanish, Welsh, German, Japanese, Chinese and French.

In June 2013, Blackman was announced as the new Children's Laureate, succeeding Julia Donaldson. Blackman helped set up the first UK Young Adult Literature Convention (YALC) during her time as Children's Laureate.

In 2022, Blackman was chosen as winner of the PEN Pinter Prize (judged that year by Ruth Borthwick, Margaret Busby and Daniel Hahn), becoming the first author of children's and Young Adult books to receive the accolade. In her acceptance address at the British Library in October 2022, Blackman named Dr Abduljalil Al-Singace as the International Writer of Courage with whom she would share the prize.

In November 2023, the exhibition Malorie Blackman: The Power of Stories opened at the British Library (on show until 25 February 2024), celebrating and contextualizing her career. As described by Wallpaper magazine, it "shines a light on Blackman's journey as an author, while touching upon social issues represented in her novels.... The landmark exhibition ... is an open invitation to learn about the importance of media representation, and Black activism throughout the 1960s to 1980s."

Blackman was appointed a Dame Commander of the Order of the British Empire in the King's 2026 Birthday Honours, for services to literature.

== Personal life ==
Malorie Blackman lives with her husband Neil and daughter Elizabeth in Kent, England. In her free time, she likes to play her piano, compose, play computer games and write poetry. She is the subject of a biography for children by Verna Wilkins.

In March 2014, Blackman joined other prominent authors in supporting the Let Books Be Books campaign, which seeks to stop children's books being labelled as "for girls" or "for boys".

In August 2014, Malorie Blackman was one of 200 public figures who were signatories to a letter to The Guardian opposing Scottish independence in the run-up to September's referendum on that issue.

Blackman is a contributor to the 2019 anthology New Daughters of Africa (edited by Margaret Busby) with a letter written to her daughter.

In 2019, Stormzy namechecked Blackman in his "Superheroes" song, and in 2022 she appeared in the "Mel Made Me Do It" promo video.

Blackman's memoir Just Sayin': My Life In Words was published by #Merky Books in 2022. She has said it was "the hardest thing I've ever written… Because I didn't make it up, did I? It’s all true! I had to revisit past events, dig deep into memories…" It was summed up by Patrice Lawrence as "a book about survival and success". The review in the Times Literary Supplement said that Blackman "offers 'a skip and a trip' through the years, writing with candour and humour."

== Works ==
=== Published books ===
==== Novels for young adults and children ====
- Not So Stupid!: Incredible Short Stories, The Women's Press, 1990, ISBN 0-7043-4924-8
- Trust Me, Livewire, 1992, ISBN 0-7043-4931-0. Corgi Children's, 2013, ISBN 0-552-56847-3
- Words Last Forever, Mammoth, 1998, ISBN 0-7497-2983-X
- The Noughts & Crosses series, in reading order:
  - Noughts & Crosses, Doubleday, 2001, ISBN 0-385-60008-9
  - Callum (novella), RHCP Digital 2012,
  - An Eye for an Eye, (novella), Corgi Children's, 2003, ISBN 0-552-54925-8
  - Knife Edge, Doubleday, 2004, ISBN 0-385-60527-7
  - Checkmate, Doubleday, 2005, ISBN 0-385-60773-3
  - Double Cross, Doubleday, 6 November 2008
  - Nought Forever (novella), Penguin, 2019 (world book day)
  - Crossfire, Penguin, 8 August 2019
  - Endgame, Penguin, 16 September 2021
- The Stuff of Nightmares, Doubleday, 2007, ISBN 0-385-61043-2
- Boys Don't Cry, Doubleday Children's, 2010. Corgi Children's, 2011, ISBN 0-552-54862-6
- Unheard Voices: An Anthology of Stories and Poems to Commemorate the Bicentenary Anniversary of the Abolition of the Slave Trade, ed. Malorie Blackman, Corgi Children's, 2007, ISBN 0-552-55600-9
- Noble Conflict, Doubleday Children's, 2013, ISBN 0-385-61042-4
- Chasing the Stars, 2016, ISBN 0-857-53141-7

==== Short stories for young adults ====
- "Humming Through My Fingers" in the multi-author collection Shining On: A Collection of Stories in Aid of the Teen Cancer Trust, Picadilly Press, 2006, ISBN 1-85340-893-X
- Short story in the multi-author collection The Crew and Other Teen Fiction, Heinemann Library, ISBN 0-431-01875-8

==== Novels for children ====
- Hacker, Doubleday, 1992, ISBN 0-385-40278-3
- Operation Gadgetman!, Doubleday, 1993, ISBN 0-385-40337-2
- Jack Sweettooth the 73rd, Viking Children's Books, 1995, ISBN 0-670-85539-1
- The Space Stowaway, Ginn, 1995, ISBN 0-602-26393-X
- Whizziwig (illustrated by Stephen Lee), Viking Children's Books, 1995, ISBN 0-670-85705-X
- Thief!, Doubleday, 1995, ISBN 0-552-52808-0
- A.N.T.I.D.O.T.E, Doubleday, 1996, ISBN 0-552-52839-0
- Pig-Heart Boy, Doubleday, 1997, ISBN 0-385-40681-9
- Animal Avengers (illustrated by Bill Greenhead and Stik), Mammoth, 1999, ISBN 0-7497-3557-0
- Dangerous Reality, Doubleday, 1999, ISBN 0-385-40680-0
- Don't Be Afraid (illustrated by Bob Harvey), Ginn, 1999, ISBN 0-602-27549-0
- Forbidden Game, Puffin Books, 1999, ISBN 0-14-130321-2
- Hostage (illustrated by Derek Brazell), Barrington Stoke, 1999, ISBN 1-902260-12-0
- Tell Me No Lies, Macmillan Children's Books, 1999, ISBN 0-333-72645-6
- Whizziwig Returns (illustrated by Stephen Lee), Puffin, 1999, ISBN 0-14-130458-8
- Dead Gorgeous, Doubleday, 2002, ISBN 0-385-60009-7
- Cloud Busting, Doubleday, 2004, ISBN 0-385-60796-2
- The Deadly Dare Mysteries (contents: Deadly Dare, 1995, Computer Ghost, 1997, Lie Detectives, 1998; illustrated by Neil Chapman), Corgi Children's, 2005, ISBN 0-552-55353-0
- Whizziwig and Whizziwig Returns (illustrated by Stephen Lee), Corgi Children's, 2005, ISBN 0-440-86657-X
- Doctor Who: The Ripple Effect, Puffin, 2013

==== Short stories for children ====
- "Contact" in the multi-author collection Out of This World: Stories of Virtual Reality (chosen by Wendy Cooling), Dolphin, 1997, ISBN 1-85881-602-5
- Aesop's Fables (retold by Malorie Blackman, illustrated by Patrice Aggs), Scholastic, 1998, ISBN 0-590-54382-2
- "Dare to be Different" (illustrated by Jane Ray) in the multi-author collection Dare to be Different, Bloomsbury Publishing, 1999, ISBN 0-7475-4021-7
- "Peacemaker" in the multi-author collection Peacemaker and Other Stories (illustrated by Peter Richardson and David Hine), Heinemann Educational, 1999, ISBN 0-435-11600-2

==== Books for new readers ====
- The Betsey Biggalow stories:
  - Betsey Biggalow the Detective (illustrated by Lis Toft), Piccadilly Press, 1992, ISBN 1-85340-163-3
  - Betsey Biggalow is Here! (illustrated by Lis Toft), Piccadilly Press, 1992, ISBN 1-85340-172-2
  - Hurricane Betsey (illustrated by Lis Toft), Piccadilly Press, 1993, ISBN 1-85340-199-4
  - Magic Betsey (illustrated by Lis Toft), Piccadilly Press, 1994, ISBN 1-85340-237-0
  - Betsey's Birthday Surprise (illustrated by Lis Toft), Piccadilly Press, 1996, ISBN 0-590-55864-1
- The Girl Wonder series:
  - Girl Wonder and the Terrific Twins (illustrated by Pat Ludlow), Orion Children's Books, 1991, ISBN 0-575-05048-9
  - Girl Wonder's Winter Adventures (illustrated by Lis Toft), Orion Children's Books, 1992, ISBN 0-575-05383-6
  - Girl Wonder to the Rescue (illustrated by Lis Toft), Gollancz, 1994, ISBN 0-575-05774-2
  - The Amazing Adventures of Girl Wonder (illustrated by Lis Toft), Barn Owl Books, 2003, ISBN 1-903015-27-8
- The Puzzle Planet adventures:
  - Peril on Planet Pellia (illustrated by Patrice Aggs), Orchard Books, 1996, ISBN 1-85213-935-8
  - The Mellion Moon Mystery (illustrated by Patrice Aggs), Orchard Books, 1996, ISBN 1-85213-936-6
  - The Secret of the Terrible Hand (illustrated by Patrice Aggs), Orchard Books, 1996, ISBN 1-86039-370-5
  - Quasar Quartz Quest (illustrated by Patrice Aggs) Orchard Books, 1996, ISBN 1-85213-938-2
- The Longman Book Project (with translations to Welsh):
  - Rachel versus Bonecrusher the Mighty, Longman, 1994, ISBN 0-582-12151-5
  - Rachel and the Difference Thief (illustrated by Kim Harley), Longman, 1994, ISBN 0-582-12152-3
  - Crazy Crocs (with Alexander McCall Smith and Sally-Ann Lever), Longman, 1994, ISBN 0-582-12208-2
- Elaine You're a Brat! (illustrated by Doffy Weir), Orchard Books, 1991, ISBN 1-85213-365-1
- My Friend's a Gris-Quok (illustrated by Philip Hopman), Scholastic, 1994, ISBN 0-590-55864-1
- Grandma Gertie's Haunted Handbag (illustrated by David Price), Heinemann, 1996, ISBN 0-434-97225-8
- Space Race (illustrated by Colin Mier), Corgi Children's, 1997, ISBN 0-552-54542-2
- Fangs (illustrated by Tony Blundell), Orchard Books, 1998, ISBN 1-86039-734-4
- Snow Dog (illustrated by Sabrina Good), Corgi Children's, 2001, ISBN 0-552-54703-4
- The Monster Crisp-Guzzler (illustrated by Sami Sweeten), Corgi Children's, 2002, ISBN 0-552-54783-2
- Sinclair, Wonder Bear (illustrated by Deborah Allwright), Egmont Books, 2003, ISBN 1-4052-0589-X

==== Picture books ====
- That New Dress (illustrated by Rhian Nest James), Hodder Wayland, 1991, ISBN 0-7500-0442-8
- Mrs Spoon's Family (illustrated by Jan McCafferty), Andersen Press, 1995, ISBN 0-86264-582-4
- Dizzy's Walk (illustrated by Pamela Venus), Tamarind Books, 1999, ISBN 1-870516-41-9
- Marty Monster (illustrated by Kim Harley), Tamarind Books, 1999, ISBN 1-870516-42-7
- I Want a Cuddle! (illustrated by Joanne Partis), Orchard Books, 2001, ISBN 1-84121-823-5
- Jessica Strange (with Alison Bartlett), Hodder Children's Books, 2002, ISBN 0-340-77963-2
- Contributed to A Christmas Tree of Stories, Scholastic Press, 1999, ISBN 0-439-01192-2

=== Memoir ===
- Just Sayin': My Life In Words, Cornerstone (Merky Books), 2023, ISBN 978-1529118698

=== Television scripts ===
Year	Title	Notes	Broadcaster
1996	Gadgetman	TV film; based on her novel "Operation Gadgetman!", directed by Jim Goddard and starring Marina Sirtis	Hallmark Channel
1996–1997	Frighteners	TV series	CITV
1998–2000	Whizziwig	18 episodes (series 1–3)	CITV
1999	Pig Heart Boy	6 episodes	CBBC
2000	Whole New Heart	TV film; directed by Kate Cheeseman	
2004	Byker Grove	Episodes: #16.19 and #16.20	CBBC
2007	Jackanory Junior	Episode: "Ellie and the Cat"	CBeebies
2018	Doctor Who	Episode: "Rosa", co-written with Chris Chibnall	BBC One
2020–2022	Noughts + Crosses	Based on her novel series; 10 episodes (series 1 and 2)	BBC One

=== Stage plays ===
- The Amazing Rob The Mechanic
- Noughts and Crosses

=== Radio scripts ===
- Noughts and Crosses

== Awards and nominations ==
=== Body of work ===
- 1997, Excelle/Write Thing Children's Author of the Year Award.
- 2005, Children's Book Circle's Eleanor Farjeon Award.
- 2008, OBE
- 2013, The Kitschies Black Tentacle for "outstanding achievement in encouraging and elevating the conversation around genre literature"
- 2022, PEN Pinter Prize.
- 2026, DBE

=== Novels ===
==== For Hacker (1995) ====
- 1994, W.H. Smith Mind Boggling Book of the Year Award.
- 1994, Young Telegraph/Gimme 5 Children's Book of the Year Award.
- 1995, Birmingham/TSB Children's Book Award (shortlist).

==== For A.N.T.I.D.O.T.E (1997) ====
- 1997, Stockport Children's Book of the Year Award (Key Stage 3 category).
- 1997, Stockton-on-Tees Children's Book Award (shortlisted).
- 1998, Sheffield Children's Book Award (highly commended).
- 2001, Stockport Schools Book Award (shortlisted).

==== For Pig-Heart Boy (1997) ====
- 1998, Carnegie Medal (shortlist).
- 1998, UKRA Award.
- 1999, Lancashire Children's Book of the Year (shortlist).
- 1999, Wirral Paperback of the Year Award.

==== For Tell Me No Lies (1999) ====
- 1999, Stockport Children's Book Award (shortlisted) (Key Stage 4 category).

==== For Dead Gorgeous (2002) ====
- 2003, Calderdale Book of the Year (shortlist).
- 2003, Salford Children's Book Award (shortlist).

==== For books in the Noughts & Crosses series ====
- 2002, Lancashire Children's Book of the Year.
- 2002, Red House Children's Book Award.
- 2002, Sheffield Children's Book Award.
- 2003, Wirral Paperback of the Year Award.
- 2004, Fantastic Fiction Award.
- 2005, Berkshire Book Award (shortlist).
- 2005, Lancashire Children's Book of the Year (shortlist).
- 2005, Redbridge Teenage Book Award (shortlist).
- 2006, Lancashire Children's Book of the Year (shortlist).
- 2006, Staffordshire Young People's Book of the Year.

==== For Cloud Busting (2004) ====
- 2004, Nestlé Smarties Book Prize (Silver Award) (6–8 years category).
- 2005, Redbridge Children's Book Award (shortlist).
- 2005, Stockport Schools Book Award (shortlisted).
- 2006, Nottingham Children's Book Award (shortlist) (10–11 years category).
- 2006, West Sussex Children's Book Award (shortlist).

==== For Crossfire (2019) ====
- 2019, Costa Children's Book Award (Shortlist).

=== Television adaptations ===
==== For Pig-Heart Boy ====
- 2000, BAFTA Best Drama.
- 2000, Race and Media Best Drama Award.
- 2000, Royal Television Society Award (Children's Drama category).
- 2001, Chicago TV Festival (shortlist).
- 2001, Prix Danube Children's Jury Prize.

==== For the Doctor Who episode "Rosa" ====
- 2019, Hugo Award for Best Dramatic Presentation (Short Form), nominated

Cultural offices
Preceded by Julia Donaldson	Children's Laureate of the United Kingdom; 2013–2015	Succeeded by Chris Riddell
