= Boys Don't Cry (novel) =

2010 novel by Malorie Blackman

- First edition (publ. Doubleday)
- Author: Malorie Blackman
- Language: English
- Publisher: Doubleday
- Publication date: 2010

Boys Don't Cry is a 2010 novel by Malorie Blackman. The novel explores the experience of Dante as he discovers that he is the father of a child by his ex-girlfriend.

In The Guardian, Mary Hoffman described the novel as "a good book and a great story." Hoffman says that "how Dante comes to terms with fatherhood and his responsibilities is genuinely moving, while staying on the right side of sentimentality." Nicholas Tucker in The Independent described the novel as, at times, "too much plot manipulation has crept into this story", while "The rest of this novel still shows her writing at its best, creating characters and a story which, once read, will not easily go away."
