= Bramwell (TV series) =

Television series

- Genre: Medical drama
- Created by: Lucy Gannon
- Starring: Jemma Redgrave; Ruth Sheen; David Calder; Kevin McMonagle; Keeley Gainey; Ben Brazier; Cliff Parisi
- Composer: Stephen Warbeck
- Country of origin: United Kingdom
- Original language: English
- No. of series: 4
- No. of episodes: 27

Production
- Executive producer: Margaret Mitchell
- Producers: Harriet Davison; Tim Whitby
- Production locations: Sarratt, Hertfordshire, England, United Kingdom
- Cinematography: Tony Miller; Daf Hobson; John Hooper
- Running time: 50 minutes, Series 1–3; 100 minutes, Series 4
- Production companies: Whitby Davison Productions; Carlton Television

Original release
- Network: ITV
- Release: 22 May 1995 – 18 June 1998

Bramwell is a British television series starring Jemma Redgrave as Dr Eleanor Bramwell, a woman challenging the domination of men in the medical establishment, who runs a free hospital for the poor in the East End of London, during the late Victorian era. The series was produced by Whitby Davison Productions in association with Carlton Television, and was shown on ITV 22 May 1995 to 18 June 1998, in a total of four series.

== Plot ==
=== Series 1 ===
The series begins in 1895 with Dr Eleanor Bramwell, working in a London hospital. She is treated as an inferior by the male doctors, and her opinions are often ignored. After a disagreement with a senior doctor, Eleanor is dismissed. Her father, Dr Robert Bramwell, recommends she join him in his private practice of rich, elderly clients. Eleanor however receives an offer from Lady Peters, a friend of the family, who proposes to fund a small hospital in a London slum, where Eleanor will treat the impoverished locals. Together, Eleanor and Lady Peters establish The Thrift, a free hospital with six beds. The Thrift is named for its location on Thrift Street. The staff of the hospital rapidly expands. Stiff, serious Nurse Carr is hired to assist Eleanor, and Mr Bentley, a former patient with an amputated foot, is hired to act as a porter. Eleanor quickly finds the hospital desperately requires an anaesthetist but has little money to pay for one. She begs a former colleague, Dr Joe Marsham to work at The Thrift part-time and he agrees on the condition that he will be able to perform surgery as well (which he does free in order to enhance his skills). The first series focuses on the ups and downs of The Thrift. Each episode usually focuses on one patient or event occurring at The Thrift. Social issues of the time are often tackled such as racism, alcoholism or the conditions in the workhouse. Near the end of the season, it appears that Eleanor will be married to a family friend but breaks the engagement when she realises she will be forced to give up her work. As the season closes, Lady Peters becomes seriously ill. Her personal physician misdiagnoses her condition and by the time her true condition is realised, it is too late to save her. After her death, her fortune is left to The Thrift.

=== Series 2 ===
In the second series, The Thrift attempts to survive without Lady Peters' guidance, management and financial assistance. A new character, Dr Finn O'Neill is introduced when a cholera epidemic occurs in the area and Finn assists in the hospital. Eleanor, Robert and Dr Marsham intensely dislike Finn and blame him for the death of a patient. Mr. Bentley also falls ill and because of a miscalculation in medication dosages, dies of poisoning. To assist the impoverished Bentley family, Eleanor hires Mr Bentley's teenage son, Sidney, to act as the porter. Eleanor, despite her original opinions of Dr O'Neill, falls in love with him in the last episode of the season. They enjoy a brief romance but are soon separated. Finn is forced to take a two-year position in Chicago but promises to marry Eleanor on his return. Robert Bramwell disapproves of Eleanor's relationship with Finn and is shocked when Eleanor admits she consummated the relationship with Finn. The usually close and happy relationship between Eleanor and her father is severely strained.

=== Series 3 ===
Series Three begins a year after Finn's leaving. He has returned to England for a conference and takes this opportunity to visit Eleanor. Eleanor confirms that she still wishes to be married to Finn in a year when he permanently returns to England. Mr Marsham considers taking a better position in Edinburgh, but remains at The Thrift when his wife is diagnosed with breast cancer. The cancer is too advanced to save her and she dies in Dr Marsham's arms. Finn returns, but with shocking news. He has married a young daughter of an American colleague. Eleanor is crushed by the news and is forced to take a vacation from The Thrift. The Thrift struggles to manage without her for several months while she stays in the countryside with friends. It begins to appear that Eleanor, because of her fragile state, will never be able to work again, but she discovers a measles epidemic occurring in the village. The outbreak causes Eleanor to rediscover her passion for medicine and her strong personality. She returns to London. Eleanor is once more forced to see Finn when his new bride becomes sick. As Eleanor cares for her, Finn admits his marriage was purely for money and status. He suggests that Eleanor become his mistress so that he can enjoy the benefits of marriage while still having Eleanor. She refuses and insists she does not love him. In the meantime, Robert has become engaged to a wealthy widow, Alice Costigan. Robert attempts to insist that Eleanor stay with him and Alice once they move, but Eleanor refuses. Robert withdraws all financial support, leading Eleanor to propose to Dr Marsham. He instead proposes to her, and she accepts.

=== Series 4 ===
The fourth and final series included only two episodes and was dramatically different from the previous three series. Robert Bramwell and Alice Costigan make no appearance in the series, and their whereabouts are not mentioned. Sidney Bentley no longer appears but is replaced by another teenage porter, Tom. Tom appears in only one episode, before enlisting in the army. In the two episodes, Eleanor allows The Thrift to perform medical check-ups on soldiers, which leads to her meeting Major Quarrie. She and Marsham disagree about her decision and decide to end the engagement. Eleanor has an affair with Major Quarrie, despite their clearly different personalities and interests, resulting in a pregnancy. Eleanor makes plans to give the child up for adoption as Major Quarrie is not interested in marriage and will be going to fight in the Boer War in a fortnight. She becomes obsessed with locating the child of a patient at The Thrift and searches the slums. She ignores her responsibilities at The Thrift, alienates her friends and coworkers. Her behaviour forces the manager of The Thrift and Dr. Marsham to dismiss her. She is devastated. At the last minute, Major Quarrie leaves the military and proposes to Eleanor. She accepts his offer because she will be able to keep the child if she is married and because she loves him. Major Quarrie is also clearly besotted with Eleanor. The series ends at the church where the two will marry.

== Cast ==
- Jemma Redgrave as Dr Eleanor Bramwell
- Ruth Sheen as Nurse Ethel Carr
- Kevin McMonagle as Dr Joe Marsham
- Keeley Gainey as Kate (Series 1–3)
- David Calder as Dr Robert Bramwell (Series 1–3)
- Michele Dotrice as Lady Cora Peters (Series 1)
- Robert Hardy as Sir Herbert Hamilton (Series 1)
- Cliff Parisi as Daniel Bentley (Series 1–2)
- Ben Brazier as Sidney Bentley (Series 2–3)
- Andrew Connolly as Dr Finn O'Neill (Series 2–3)
- Maureen Beattie as Alice Costigan (Series 3)
- David Bark-Jones as Major Quarrie (Series 4)

== Episodes ==
=== Series overview ===
Series	Episodes	Originally released	
Series	Episodes	First released	Last released
1	7	22 May 1995	3 July 1995
2	8	15 April 1996	3 June 1996
3	10	21 April 1997	7 July 1997
4	2	15 June 1998	18 June 1998

=== Series 1 (1995) ===
No. overall	No. in series	Title	Directed by	Written by	Original release date	Viewers (millions)
1	1	"The World of Man"	David Tucker	Jonathan Rich	22 May 1995	N/A
2	2	"The Threat of Reprise"	David Tucker	Lucy Gannon	29 May 1995	N/A
3	3	"The Outcast's Baby"	Laura Sims	Lucy Gannon	5 June 1995	N/A
4	4	"The Thrift of the Hunter"	Laura Sims	Lucy Gannon	12 June 1995	N/A
5	5	"The Doctor's Committal"	David Tucker	Lucy Gannon	19 June 1995	N/A
6	6	"The Trust of Kings"	David Tucker	Lucy Gannon	26 June 1995	N/A
7	7	"The Ideal Suitor"	David Tucker	Lucy Gannon	3 July 1995	N/A

=== Series 2 (1996) ===
No. overall	No. in series	Title	Directed by	Written by	Original release date	Viewers (millions)
8	1	"The Rule of Thuggery"	David Tucker	Lucy Gannon	15 April 1996	N/A
9	2	"The Strain of Conscience"	David Tucker	Lucy Gannon	22 April 1996	N/A
10	3	"The Return of the Betrayer"	David Tucker	Lucy Gannon	29 April 1996	N/A
11	4	"The New Formula"	David Tucker	Michael Crompton	6 May 1996	N/A
12	5	"The International Connection"	Paul Unwin	Christian Wheeler	13 May 1996	N/A
13	6	"The Carnival Attraction"	Paul Unwin	Helen Greeves	20 May 1996	N/A
14	7	"The Identity Loss"	David Tucker	Peter Lloyd	27 May 1996	N/A
15	8	"The Final Days"	David Tucker	Lucy Gannon	3 June 1996	N/A

=== Series 3 (1997) ===
No. overall	No. in series	Title	Directed by	Written by	Original release date	Viewers (millions)
16	1	"The Overnight Stay"	Paul Unwin	Lucy Gannon	21 April 1997	N/A
17	2	"The Entrenched Rival"	Paul Unwin	Peter Lloyd	28 April 1997	N/A
18	3	"The Diagnosis"	David Tucker	Helen Greeves	12 May 1997	N/A
19	4	"The Beaten Wife"	Paul Murton	Helen Greeves	19 May 1997	N/A
20	5	"The Medical Hopeful"	David Tucker	Brian Thompson	2 June 1997	N/A
21	6	"The Mercenary Expecting"	Kate Cheeseman	Lucy Gannon	9 June 1997	N/A
22	7	"The Change of Life"	Paul Murton	Jonathan Rich	16 June 1997	N/A
23	8	"The Faith Healer"	David Tucker	Brian Thompson	23 June 1997	N/A
24	9	"The Vaccination Experiment"	Tim Whitby	Lucy Gannon	30 June 1997	N/A
25	10	"The Short Chapter"	David Tucker	Lucy Gannon	7 July 1997	N/A

=== Series 4 (1998) ===
No. overall	No. in series	Title	Directed by	Written by	Original release date	Viewers (millions)
26	1	"The Brave Boys"	Paul Unwin	Lucy Gannon	15 June 1998	N/A
27	2	"The Loose Women"	Tim Whitby	Lucy Gannon	18 June 1998	N/A

== Broadcast ==
The series was also broadcast in other countries, airing in the United States on PBS from 1996 to 2001.

== Home media ==
The complete series was released on DVD on 30 August 2010.
