= Sandra Huggett =

English actress

Sandra Huggett (born in Surrey, England) is an English actress.

She grew up in Ross-on-Wye, Herefordshire, but now lives in East Sussex. Her father was professional golfer Brian Huggett. She attended both Haberdashers Monmouth School For Girls and Mountview Academy of Theatre Arts. Before she started acting, she used to be a test-driver for the car manufacturer Ford.

Her first role on TV was in 1997, when she was part of the original cast of Channel 5's soap opera Family Affairs. She played bisexual Holly Hart for two years, until her character was written out by being killed in a boat explosion.

She dated her Family Affairs co-star and on-screen twin brother, Rocky Marshall, but they split up as she said, "Going out with him was odd I suppose. Some people find it difficult to divorce soap from reality. I enjoyed it but we just grew apart".

She is most well known in the UK for her role as S.H.O. Holly Miles, in the long-running BBC medical drama series, Casualty, which she played for two years, for series 14 and 15 of the show. Sandra had a major storyline in series 15, when her character Holly was terrorized by a stalker, which was resolved in the series finale. Holly also had an on/off relationship with Dr. Patrick Spiller (Ian Kelsey), which proved popular. Huggett's contract wasn't renewed and she left the show in 2001.

Since leaving Casualty, Huggett has appeared in many other TV shows, such as Doctors as Fleur Rogers, Sweet Medicine, Too Good To Be True, If The Lights Go Out, According to Bex, Donovan, Vincent and Goldplated. In 2013 she played the role of Shirley Wilson in the BBC supernatural drama In The Flesh.

Huggett went on to do theatre work, appearing in Saturday Night Fever which toured around England, and Same Time Next Year in which she starred alongside fellow Casualty actor Ian Kelsey. She has also appeared in several films, including the lead role in the 2003 short film Girl on a Cycle with Sean Hughes and Nicholas Rowe. She also does voice-over work for adverts and television documentaries.

In May 2016 Huggett played Maxine in BBC One drama In the Club by Kay Mellor. She is currently in ITV soap opera Coronation Street, playing DS MacKinnon. She first appeared in this role in November 2016.

In 2014, at season 7 of Lee Mack's Not Going Out, she played Karen, an alcohol counsellor.
