= Kate Cheeseman =

British film director

Kate Cheeseman, is a British film director, known primarily for TV shows such as Pig Heart Boy, Casualty

She won the BAFTA (British Academy of Film and Television Arts) Children's Drama award 2000 for Pig Heart Boy.

== Filmography ==
Year	Title	Notes
1995	London Bridge	Television Series
1995	The Bill	Television Series
1997	Bramwell	Television Series
1999	Whole New Heart	Television Series
1999	Grange Hill	Television Series
1999	Pig Heart Boy	Television Series
2000	Casualty	Television Series
2009	The Collector	
2003	Never Say Rabbit in a Boat	
2012	Roadkiller	Short film, also credited as executive producer
2016	Love Somehow	Short film, nominated at the International Film Festival of Wales
2017	In the Mirror	
2018	What Happened to Evie	Short film, also credited as editor
