= Noughts & Crosses (novel series) =

Young adult novel series by Malorie Blackman

- Author: Malorie Blackman
- Country: United Kingdom
- Language: English
- Genre: Children's literature; Young adult fiction; Speculative fiction; Alternative history; Action-adventure; Romance
- Publisher: Random House
- Published: 2001–2021
- Media type: Print (hardcover and paperback); Audiobook eBook
- No. of books: 6 novels and 3 novellas

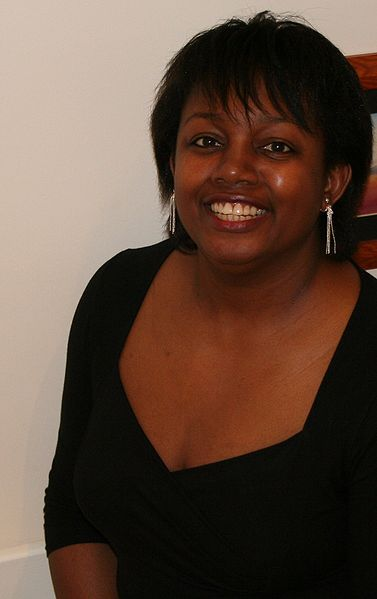
Malorie Blackman

Noughts & Crosses is a series of young adult novels by British author Malorie Blackman, with six novels and three novellas. The series is speculative fiction describing an alternative history. The series takes place in an alternative 21st-century Britain.

At the time of the series, slavery had been abolished for some time, but segregation, similar to the Jim Crow Laws, continues to operate to keep the Crosses (dark-skinned people) in control of the Noughts (lighter-skinned people). An international organisation, the Pangaean Economic Community, exists. Seeming to be similar to the United Nations in scope but similar to the European Union in powers, it is playing a role in forcing change by directives and boycotts. Britain is known as Albion, Africa is one country called Zafrika, and Scandinavia — known as Fenno-Scandia — is the only Nought country left.

The first book is written from two different perspectives – Callum's and Sephy's (Persephone) – and their experiences of their entwined but very different worlds. The chapters alternate, with even-numbered chapters being from Callum's view and odd ones Sephy's.

There are six books in the series: Noughts and Crosses, Knife Edge, Checkmate, Double Cross, Crossfire, and Endgame.

== Novels ==
=== Noughts and Crosses ===
Noughts & Crosses
- Author: Malorie Blackman
- Language: English
- Series: Noughts & Crosses saga
- Subject: Forbidden Love, Racism, Political Terrorism
- Genre: Action, Adventure, Romance
- Publisher: Random House
- Publication date: 2001
- Publication place: Britain
- Media type: Book
- Pages: 454 pages
- ISBN: 978-0-385-60008-8
- OCLC: 45592902
- Followed by: Knife Edge

Persephone "Sephy" Hadley is a noughts and the daughter of a wealthy senior politician, Kamal Hadley, who later becomes prime minister. Callum McGregor is a cross, and they used to play together when Jasmine Adeyebe-Hadley, Sephy's mother, employed Meggie McGregor, Callum's mother, as a nanny. Ever since Jasmine fired Meggie, however, Sephy and Callum's friendship has been secret, as such interracial friendships are frowned upon by society.

The two meet again in Heathcroft, a high school for noughts that now accepts the best-performing crosses. Sephy is overjoyed to see Callum in her class, but most of her classmates do not accept her association with a cross. Despite this, she deepens her relationship with Callum and even sits at a table with crosses, upsetting Callum, though they eventually make up.

Meanwhile, Callum's elder brother, Jude, and his father, Ryan, join the Liberation Militia (LM), a violent paramilitary organisation against Cross supremacy. Jude and Ryan are accused of participating in the LM bombing of Dundale Shopping Centre, and Callum is also accused after he told Sephy to leave the shopping centre. He is ultimately spared due to a lack of evidence. Callum has to leave school, and Ryan faces the gallows. Sephy, remembering her friendship with the McGregor family, secretly hires a prominent Cross lawyer to defend Ryan. Escaping hanging, Ryan is given a life sentence but is killed by an electric fence, supposedly in an escape attempt.

Sephy decides to start anew and persuades a reluctant Jasmine to let her attend a boarding school, Chivers. She has not heard from Callum in a week, so she writes a letter asking him to run away with her and if he does not contact her, she will be leaving for Chivers. Callum, however, has decided to join the LM, and does not read the letter until it is too late. He sprints to her house and fails to catch up to the car as it pulls out of the driveway. Having not seen Callum running behind, Sephy concludes that their friendship is no longer as important to him as she had thought.

Years later, Sephy returns home from Chivers. Upon entering the house, she discovers a letter by Callum telling her to meet him at the family's private beach. She goes there, but discovers Callum is there with other LM members to kidnap her and hold her hostage. She is taken to their hideout, and the LM members demand the release of at least five LMs and a ransom for Sephy. The LM's second-in-command, Andrew Dorn, then visits Callum and his cell members.

Callum visits injured Sephy in the room where she is being held. Alone together, Callum reveals to her his unsuccessful attempt to catch up to her before she left for Chivers. Their love rekindles, and the two end up having sex. Afterwards, Sephy escapes into the woods, chased by Jude and another LM member. Callum finds her first and gives false directions to the others; he then gives Sephy instructions to escape. Sephy then tells Callum that she had seen Andrew before in her house with Kamal, revealing that Andrew is a government informant. Informing the rest of the LM about Andrew, the remaining members agreed to split up and keep a low profile, not meeting up again until Callum's birthday.

Sephy then begins to experience strange symptoms and takes a pregnancy test, revealing that she is pregnant with Callum's child. When her parents learn of this, they pressure her to have an abortion, which Sephy repeatedly refuses. Meanwhile, Callum is working as a mechanic as a cover, and hears Kamal on the radio being interrogated over whether his daughter is pregnant. Callum then meets up with Sephy in the Hadleys' rose garden, and she confirms the rumors. While they are meeting, they are discovered, and Callum is arrested. Nobody believed Sephy when she maintains she was not raped, and Callum is sentenced to be hanged.

Kamal tells Sephy that if she keeps her child, Callum will be hanged, but if she has the abortion, he will serve years in prison instead. Kamal makes a similar offer to Callum, wanting Callum to publicly admit to raping Sephy. Both decide to keep the baby, and Callum is hanged at the gallows.

=== Knife Edge ===
Knife Edge
- Author: Malorie Blackman
- Language: English
- Series: Noughts & Crosses Saga
- Genre: Young adult fiction
- Publisher: Random House
- Publication date: 5 February 2004
- Publication place: United Kingdom
- Pages: 449 pages
- ISBN: 978-0-385-60527-4
- Preceded by: Noughts & Crosses
- Followed by: Checkmate

Sephy, living with Callum's mother, Meggie, becomes increasingly fond of her daughter, Callie Rose. Callum's guard, Jack, delivers a letter written by Callum before he dies, stating he never loved her and could not believe that Sephy was stupid enough to fall for him. He tells her to forget about him. Meggie tries to convince Sephy that Callum was forced into writing the letter by others, but Sephy believes the letter and develops postnatal depression.

She meets Jaxon, a hot-tempered man with a band, the Midges. He offers Sephy a singing part, but the Noughts are prejudiced against her because she is a Cross. In her emotional turmoil, she begins to neglect Callie Rose.

Callum's brother, Jude, blames Sephy for the terrible losses his family has suffered and is determined to destroy Sephy's life by any means necessary. He meets Cara, a Cross, and befriends her to access her money. After spending a lot of time with her, he falls in love with her despite his hatred of Crosses. Frustrated and confused with his feelings for a Cross, Jude beats her severely and runs off with a large amount of money. After Cara dies in the hospital, Jude is eventually arrested and charged with Cara's murder. He is almost guaranteed to receive the death sentence due to the wealth of evidence against him.

Sephy struggles with seeing Meggie losing the last remaining member of her family, and decides to give a false alibi to Jude for Cara's death for Meggie's sake. He escapes the death penalty and only serves a few months in prison for LM membership; afterwards, he accuses Andrew of Cara's murder in addition to being a government informer; Andrew is soon shot dead by the LM. Despite Sephy saving his life, Jude still holds a grudge against her and plots revenge.

Sephy's life begins to fall apart, as the Crosses hate her for helping Jude escape the noose, and the Noughts because she did not come to his aid sooner. While singing "Rainbow Child" to Callie Rose, she hugs her too tightly, causing the child to stop breathing. The book ends with Meggie repeatedly screaming at Sephy, "What have you done?"

=== Checkmate ===
Checkmate
- Author: Malorie Blackman
- Language: English
- Series: Noughts & Crosses Saga
- Genre: Young adult fiction
- Publisher: Random House
- Publication date: 30 June 2005
- Publication place: United Kingdom
- Pages: 511 pages
- ISBN: 978-0-385-60773-5
- Preceded by: Knife Edge
- Followed by: Double Cross

After her friend Tobey calls her a terrorist's daughter, Callie struggles with discovering the real career of her father: he was considered a terrorist. She becomes angry with her mother for hiding the truth and decides to follow in the path of her father, cutting off her friendship with Tobey despite his attempts to apologise.

Sephy feels trapped and rejects an offer of marriage from her boyfriend, Sonny. She then meets Nathan, the owner of the restaurant in which she sings, and the two start a relationship. Nathan later proposes, and Sephy accepts, but Sonny comes back into her life. She is left confused but engaged.

Jude takes Callie Rose to Kamal's house. After Kamal denies that she is his granddaughter, Jude, now the General of the LM, exploits her anger to groom her to become a suicide bomber. Jasmine attempts to bring Callie and Sephy closer together, but develops breast cancer and struggles with her mortality. Eventually, Jasmine traps Sephy and Callie Rose in her wine cellar, where the two reconcile.

Celine, the daughter of Callum's prison guard Jack, gives a letter that was written by Callum before he was hanged. Callum told Jack this was the letter with his true feelings; in the letter, he wished he had been able to stay with Sephy because he loved her so much. He also tells Sephy to keep his past secret from their child.

In the book's climax, Jasmine sets off Jude's bomb to prevent him from injuring anyone else, dying in the process. Kamal had been the intended target of the bomb, but he lost power after Jasmine's letter to the press about his rampant corruption was published.

=== Double Cross ===
Double Cross
- Author: Malorie Blackman
- Language: English
- Series: Noughts & Crosses Saga
- Genre: Young adult fiction
- Publisher: Random House
- Publication date: November 2008
- Publication place: United Kingdom
- Pages: 480 pages
- ISBN: 978-0-385-61551-8
- Preceded by: Checkmate
- Followed by: Crossfire

The book opens with Kamal's party badly losing to a more liberal government. Callie Rose fears the return of her vengeful uncle Jude, and the press fails to mention Jude in connection with the bomb.

Callie Rose's best friend and later boyfriend, Tobey, is worried about his future. As a Nought boy at an exclusive school, he hopes to keep out of trouble, go to university, get a good job and leave behind the dangerous streets of his childhood. However, he gets caught up in gang warfare when he is offered the chance to earn some easy money by making a few "deliveries." He finds out the delivery was for one of the prominent members of the Dowds, a notorious gang of Crosses.

He keeps this a secret from Callie Rose, and after they consummate their relationship, Callie Rose leaves but promises to return. The next day, when Tobey and Callie Rose meet up with their friends, Callie Rose is shot by a hail of bullets from McAuley, the boss of a gang of Noughts, the rivals to the Dowds. Her surgery is successful, but she remains in a coma. Sephy is furious at Tobey for not telling the police who shot Callie Rose, but is unaware that Tobey plans on getting revenge on McAuley himself.

While Callie Rose is in the hospital, Tobey gets a new job at the Dowds' restaurant. He meets Rebecca, Vanessa Dowd's daughter. Rebecca enjoys his company as he treats her like a person, unlike the other boys who are interested only in her family and money. Tobey eventually goes out with her but is conflicted between her and Callie Rose.

Callie Rose wakes from her coma and finds out that Jude was indeed killed by the bomb. However, she also discovers that Tobey is now dating Rebecca, as she had been in a coma for so long.

During a visit to Vanessa Dowd's house, Tobey is revealed to have once made deliveries to McAuley, shocking Rebecca. Tobey reassures her that he does not work for him any longer, but he decides to end their relationship and be just friends. When Rebecca leaves, McAuley appears and stabs her. He then orders Tobey to meet him at his warehouse.

Aware of McAuley's intent to kill him, Tobey sets up a plan with Owen Dowd, Rebecca's brother. He invests in one of McAuley's minions to frame him as a traitor. The plan works, but Owen and Tobey are almost killed in the process. However, one of Tobey's friends, Dan, comes in and kills McAuley's minions, saving both their lives. Dan then goes on the run for the murders.

When he returns to Callie, Tobey admits to his actions leading to the death of five people and why Dan is now on the run; Callie replies that Jasmine and Jude died because of her. They eventually resume their relationship. In the epilogue, it is revealed that both Callie and Tobey go to university to study law and that Tobey has set up and helps fund the Meadowview Shelter to help those with drug and alcohol addictions.

=== Crossfire ===
Crossfire
- Author: Malorie Blackman
- Language: English
- Series: Noughts & Crosses Saga
- Genre: Young adult fiction
- Publisher: Random House
- Publication date: 8 August 2019
- Publication place: United Kingdom
- Pages: 432 pages
- ISBN: 978-0-241-38844-0
- Preceded by: Double Cross
- Followed by: Endgame

The fifth book in the series, Crossfire, was published on 8 August 2019. Part of the book picks up months after Double Cross on Callie's birthday, exactly one year after Checkmate; the rest occurs eighteen years later.

Tobey's guilt over Rebecca's death leads him to believe he no longer deserves Callie Rose, estranging himself from her. Sephy and Nathan marry, and she is pregnant with a son, Troy, by Callie Rose's next birthday. During the party, Tobey and Callie Rose have a huge argument over his continued secrecy about his involvement in McAuley's death. He decides to end his and Callie Rose's relationship for good.

During the party, Tobey has sex with a woman named Misty, who becomes pregnant and gives birth to Tobey's daughter, Libby. He attempts to have a relationship with her for their child's sake, but it falls apart.

In his resulting depression, Tobey briefly joins Nought Forever, the Liberation Militia's spiritual successor, but soon quits. Tobey pursues a career in politics and is aided and bankrolled by Dan, now a powerful gangster. He uses his growing fortune to financially support Misty and Libby, but Misty refuses to let him see their daughter and conceals his identity from Libby. She gradually spends Libby's entire trust fund, becoming an alcoholic and drug addict, and abuses Libby, who struggles with anxiety and self-harm.

Troy and Libby become friends, but after a brief romance, their relationship sours and they become bitter rivals. Callie Rose attends law school and later works for a prominent lawyer, becoming one of the best barristers in the country; Nathan is killed in a hit-and-run, leaving Sephy and Troy devastated. Over the next two years, Sonny returns to Sephy's life and they resume their relationship, but Troy discovers what appears to be the same car that killed Nathan on Sonny's land, leaving him convinced that Sonny murdered his father.

With Dan's help, Tobey is elected as the first Nought Prime Minister, but Dan is later murdered at a party attended by Tobey, Sephy, and Owen Dowd. Tobey is arrested for the crime and enlists Callie Rose to defend him. The two go on to have a one-night stand, but Callie Rose is repulsed to learn of his past affiliation with Nought Forever. When she threatens to drop him as a client, he blackmails her into continuing to defend him by threatening to reveal their affair to her employers.

When she finally learns of her father's identity, Libby disowns Misty and contacts Tobey. Unwilling to lose the financial support Tobey has been providing, Misty abducts Libby and Troy, holding them hostage to extort more money from Tobey. However, several of Dan's former enforcers murder Misty and take the teenagers captive themselves, demanding that Callie Rose drop Tobey as a client and that he plead guilty. To get Callie Rose to comply with the kidnappers' demands, Tobey tells her that Sephy murdered Dan and that he covered for her by planting evidence to make himself appear guilty. Despite this revelation and the danger to Libby and Troy, Callie Rose continues to defend Tobey, who pleads his innocence as the trial begins. In response, the kidnappers decide to leave Libby and Troy to die, sealing them in their cellar prison.

=== Endgame ===
Endgame
- Author: Malorie Blackman
- Language: English
- Series: Noughts & Crosses Saga
- Genre: Young adult fiction
- Publisher: Random House
- Publication date: 16 September 2021
- Publication place: United Kingdom
- Pages: 480 pages
- ISBN: 978-0-241-44399-6
- Preceded by: Crossfire

A sixth and final instalment, Endgame, was released on 16 September 2021. The book picks up immediately after the events of Crossfire, while containing flashbacks to the night of Dan Jeavons' murder.

It is revealed that all the guests at Dan's party were invited due to their hatred for Tobey, and that Dan had had a confrontation with every one of them during the night: Eva, his right-hand woman, for her trafficking drugs and people against his and Tobey's orders, Tobey, for his intentions to break off their alliance upon becoming prime minister, and Sephy, over his extortion of money from her and Nathan's restaurant along with Sephy's belief he had had Nathan executed.

Sephy left the party early but later returned to find Dan dead; she was caught on CCTV handling the murder weapon, leading Tobey to believe she killed him. Upon discovering this from Callie Rose, Sephy tracks down and questions several of the other guests, deducing the real murderer's identity. Sephy also accepts Sonny's proposal, but continues to suffer from nightmares of Callum, still tormented with guilt over his death 36 years earlier.

Having concealed Sephy's presence at Dan's party, Callie Rose is arrested for obstruction of justice, and despite being quickly bailed out, her legal career is effectively ruined. She and Tobey work relentlessly to track down Troy and Libby, enlisting the aid of Callie Rose's trusted private investigator, Duba and Dan's former primary enforcer, Jarvis. The former lovers gradually reconcile, particularly after Tobey vows to do whatever is necessary to regain her love and trust, even proposing to her.

Duba is revealed to have manipulated Misty into abducting Troy and Libby, though absent when Misty was killed. Evading and killing several of Eva's enforcers, Duba retrieves Troy and Libby, anonymously contacts Tobey to reinstate Misty's original deal for a vast amount of money, and locks the teenagers in a car rigged with a bomb.

Sephy, Callie Rose, Tobey, Duba, Sonny, and Jarvis then confront Eva, who has seized control of Dan's criminal enterprises and has had Owen Dowd assassinated. She admits to hijacking Troy and Libby's kidnapping and having Misty killed, but also informs them that neither she nor Dan ordered Nathan's death, confirming that Sonny murdered him. She also reveals that Tobey was the true crime lord all along, with Dan acting as the decoy leader of his operation, but that he planned to abandon his life of crime upon being elected.

Deducing that Duba abducted Troy and Libby, Tobey tracks his phone, and the police rescue the teens. Duba tries to kill Tobey, but Sephy intercepts the bullets and is fatally wounded, while Tobey overpowers and kills Duba. Sephy dies in Callie Rose's arms after telling her to save Tobey. Five days after Sephy's death, Sonny is involved in a car crash that renders him comatose.

In a video message recorded by Sephy before her death, she informs Callie Rose and Tobey that she discovered Dan was murdered by his butler for impregnating his teenage daughter. The group elects not to turn in the culprit, and the case against Tobey is ultimately dropped due to lack of evidence, allowing him to continue as prime minister.

Jarvis murders Eva and assumes control of the criminal underworld on Tobey's orders, but Callie Rose finds out. Taking her mother's last words to heart, she agrees to marry Tobey to save him from himself, on the condition that he commits no further crimes and always be completely honest with her. Libby finally meets her father, and she moves in with Callie Rose, Troy and Meggie, as does Tobey following the wedding.

During the next three months, Libby is elected head student of Heathcroft High, and she and Troy form a sibling relationship and undergo therapy for their experiences, while Callie Rose considers starting a career in politics.

== Novellas ==
=== Callum ===
Callum is an alternative ending to Noughts and Crosses and was published for World Book Day 2012.

Callum decides to let Sephy flee from the other kidnappers while they are out. While he shows her the way back to town, Sephy badly injures her foot, and Callum then talks her into spending the night with him in an abandoned shack for her to recover. There, they argue but then realise their mutual love; they decide to run away together and fall asleep after having sex.

The two are then surprised by the rest of the gang, and Jude and Callum point their guns at each other; Sephy takes advantage of the confusion to flee. The story ends with Callum and Jude shooting at each other.

=== An Eye For an Eye ===
Written for World Book Day 2003, An Eye For an Eye has been republished in a new edition of Noughts & Crosses. It describes one evening, while Sephy is pregnant with Callie Rose, when her sister, Minerva, visits her. Minerva offers to patch things up with Jasmine, but Sephy tries to get Minerva to leave, as Sephy was worried about being followed by Jude. As Minerva visits, Jude arrives in the apartment after days of following Sephy, intent on killing Sephy.

Sephy tells Jude that she knew that he intended to kill her just before midnight, since it was Callum's birthday that day. As Callum did not live to see his next birthday, neither should Sephy. Minerva panics, but Sephy remains unalarmed by the danger; she tells Jude he would be doing her a favour by killing her, as she only wishes for death in Callum's absence. When Minerva tries to change her mind, Sephy lies that she hated the baby because it was alive when Callum should have been alive instead.

Attempting to provoke Jude, Sephy tells him that Kamal gave Callum the choice to save his life or to keep their baby, and Callum chose their baby. Jude loses his temper and tries to shoot her, but his gun jams. Minerva, in an attempt to save Sephy and herself, runs towards the front door and screams for help. She fails, and Jude shoots her in the shoulder.

Realising that Sephy wishes to die, he decides that killing her would help her, and opts to leave Sephy to suffer. He permits Sephy to call an ambulance for Minerva and tells her that, since he knows how much she cares for her family, he will use her baby to hurt her. Sephy threatens to kill him if he hurts her child, but resorts to pleading with Jude to leave the two of them alone. He leaves just as the ambulance arrives, with a new plan in mind; Sephy makes Minerva lie about her injuries.

=== Nought Forever ===
A World Book Day release in 2019, and a prequel to Crossfire. Following the events of Double Cross, a fugitive Dan is mortally wounded by McAuley's former enforcers, and is forced to hide out with a nurse, Eva, whose daughter, Avalon committed suicide three years earlier after being drawn into drug addiction and prostitution by McAuley. Though she hides Dan from the criminals hunting him, Eva debates whether to continue sheltering him or turn him in to the police. The novella concludes without revealing the outcome of her decision, but Crossfire suggests that Eva continued to hide Dan but ultimately convinced him to turn himself in, and remained a friend and mother figure to him during his imprisonment and his later career as a gangster.

== Characters ==
The characters from all the books from the series are as follows:

=== Primary characters ===
- Persephone Mira Hadley: the co-protagonist of Noughts & Crosses, Knife Edge, & Checkmate, and a supporting character in Double Cross, Crossfire and Endgame. Nicknamed Sephy, the daughter of a powerful Cross, Kamal Hadley. She was childhood best friends with Callum despite their different backgrounds, and she eventually fell in love with him. After a few years pass without contact, Callum kidnaps her, but they end up sleeping together and have a daughter, Callie Rose, who is raised by Sephy and Meggie after Callum is executed. She later suffocates and falls out with Callie Rose after lying to her about Callum. She marries Nathan Ealing and has a second child, Troy.
- Callum McGregor: the co-protagonist of Noughts & Crosses. A Nought who is best friends and later lovers with Sephy. He is one of the few Noughts to get into Sephy's elite school, proving his intelligence, but he suffers discriminatory bullying from the other students. After losing contact with Sephy, he works for the LM and helps them kidnap her. However, his feelings for her return, and he ends up sleeping with her, eventually helping her escape. He is executed for his involvement in Sephy's kidnapping before his daughter Callie Rose is born.
- Jude McGregor: the co-protagonist of Knife Edge, the main antagonist of Checkmate and a secondary antagonist in Noughts & Crosses. Callum's older brother who holds a grudge against Sephy as he believes her to be responsible for his brother's death. He hates all Crosses but becomes romantically inclined towards a Cross named Cara. The resulting emotional conflict becomes too much, and he beats her to death. He later attempts to use Callie Rose to get back at Sephy, training her to become a terrorist, but his plan backfires when Jasmine takes the bomb and activates it in his hotel room. Before he is killed in the bomb blast, he finally admits his feelings for Cara to himself, as she is the last thing he sees before he is killed.
- Meggie McGregor: Supporting character in all books. Callum's mother, who had been Sephy's nanny until Jasmine fired her. She convinces Sephy to move in with her and is very close to Callie Rose. However, a threat to call social services about Callie Rose estranges Sephy from her.
- Callie Rose McGregor: the protagonist of Checkmate and a supporting character in Knife Edge and Double Cross. The daughter of Callum and Sephy. She resents her mother for keeping her father's identity a secret, and joins the LM after being manipulated by her uncle, Jude. She intends to blow herself and Kamal up, but her grandmother Jasmine steals the bomb and locks her in the cellar with Sephy in a successful plan for them to make up. She enters a relationship with Tobey, her Nought friend, mirroring the unlikely relationship between her parents. Both she and Tobey go on to study law at university, but fall out.
- Tobias Sebastian Durbridge: The protagonist of Double Cross, and a supporting character in Checkmate, Crossfire, and Endgame. Nicknamed Tobey, he is Callie Rose's friend and eventual lover. He becomes involved with the dangerous gang conflict between McAuley and the Dowds but leaves the criminal life behind after Callie Rose is shot by one such gangster, putting her in a coma. He manages to kill McAuley, bringing his whole gang down in retaliation. Tobey and Callie Rose become a couple, and both go on to study law at university. He eventually becomes prime minister, with the help of his friend, Daniel Jeavons.
- Troy Ealing: Co-Protagonist of Crossfire and Endgame. Sephy and Nathan Ealing's child; Callie Rose's younger brother. Nathan dies when he is young and is raised by Sephy alone. He dislikes Sonny because he believes Sonny killed his dad. Is kidnapped by Libby's mother, Misty Jackman along with Libby.
- Liberty Jackman: Co-Protagonist of Crossfire and Endgame. Nicknamed Libby, she is Tobey and Misty's child. She is distanced from and unaware of her father and is raised by Misty alone. Misty lives on the money Tobey gave to Libby, and Libby is furious when she realises this. On a student election day, Libby is kidnapped with Troy by her mother, Misty, who is later killed by Daniel's enforcers.

=== Secondary characters ===
- Jasmine Dharma Ninah Adyebe-Hadley: Sephy and Minerva's mother, who became an alcoholic. She used to be good friends with Ryan and Meggie McGregor, as Meggie used to work for her. She is diagnosed with breast cancer and, drinking less than before, steals and activates Jude's bomb, killing her and Jude in the process to protect Sephy and Callie Rose.
- Kamal Hadley: the main antagonist of Noughts & Crosses and a secondary antagonist in Knife Edge. A powerful, avaricious Cross Home Office Minister who will do anything to gain more power and influence. He is the father of Sephy and Minerva and the grandfather of Callie Rose, but he disowns Sephy and Callie Rose. He divorces Jasmine after an unhappy marriage and remarries. A letter sent by Jasmine to the media ends his stint in power.
- Minerva "Minnie" Hadley: Sephy's older sister; she and Sephy are not very close, as Minnie is often shown to be quite selfish. She marries an affluent Cross, Zuri, and they have a son, Taj.
- Lynette McGregor: Callum's older sister, who is mentally damaged after being attacked by a group of Noughts for dating a Cross. Losing touch with reality, she fully believes she's a Cross. She eventually commits suicide by stepping out in front of a bus, but only Callum knows that it was not an accident.
- Ryan McGregor: Callum, Jude, and Lynette's father, who is killed trying to escape from prison after the Dundale bombing.
- Rebecca Dowd: Vanessa Dowd's daughter and Owen's sister. She is a rich Cross who makes her money from drugs, illegal shipments and more. She briefly dates Tobey after falling in love with him, but is killed by Alex McAuley, the Dowd family's archenemy. She is very lonely and Tobey loves her, unlike other boys, for reasons other than her family and her money. However, Tobey remains in love with Callie Rose.
- Daniel "Dan" Jeavons: Tobey's friend, who uses Tobey's desperate financial situation to introduce him to gang life. Dan later becomes a mobster and serves time in prison. He comes out and helps Tobey become prime minister with dirty tactics. Dan is killed by his butler for impregnating his daughter.
- Cara Imega: A kind-hearted Cross who falls in love with Jude. She campaigns against discrimination towards Noughts. Although Jude wants to take her money, he eventually falls in love with her as well. He becomes so confused about his feelings that he follows through with his original plan. He beats her to death and steals all her money.
- Sonny Devlin: A member of Sephy's band. Starts to go out with Sephy, but Sephy decides to end their relationship even though they have feelings for each other. He later murders Nathan due to jealousy.
- Nathan Ealing: The owner of a restaurant at which Sephy sings. They realise that they have feelings for each other and get married, having a son named Troy. He is murdered just before the events of Crossfire by Sonny.
- Eva Foxton: An old nurse who becomes a mother figure for Dan after sheltering him following McAuley's murder. She become a major advisor to him as he climbs the criminal ranks, eventually succeeding him as the leader of his gang.
- Owen Dowd: A Cross crime boss who is initially stuck in a war with McAuley during Double Cross. After betraying his brother Gideon to gain power, he partners with Dan. He is also the brother of Rebecca and is eventually murdered by Eva.
- Alex McAuley: Main antagonist of Double Cross, a Nought crime boss in a war with the Dowds. He tries to convince Tobey to join his syndicate by making drug deliveries and such, hoping to make him his protégé. McAuley slowly grows paranoid of his associates and is killed by Dan, who replaces him.

== Audio books ==
Audio books have been made from the novels in the series as follows:

- Noughts and Crosses (unabridged) - narrated by Sian Blake and Paul Chequer
- Noughts and Crosses (abridged) - narrated by Nina Sosanya and Nigel Greaves
- Knife Edge (abridged) - narrated by Nina Sosanya, John Hasler and Joan Walker
- Checkmate (abridged) - narrated by Nina Sosanya, John Hasler, Joan Walker and Adjoa Andoh
- Double Cross (abridged) - narrated by Nigel Pilkington, Nicole Davis and Joan Walker
- Crossfire (unabridged) - narrated by Vivienne Acheampong, Josh Dylan and Nathan Stewart-Jarrett

== Adaptations ==
=== Stage ===
The first book, Noughts & Crosses, was retitled Black & White and was adapted and directed for the Royal Shakespeare Company by former RSC Associate Dominic Cooke, with Richard Madden and Ony Uhiara in the lead roles of Callum and Sephy. The play garnered positive reviews, with Blackman herself saying that she "knew it was in really safe hands". It toured the UK from February to April 2008.

A second theatre adaptation of the first book titled Noughts and Crosses premiered at Derby Theatre in February 2019, and toured the UK. This stage version is adapted by Sabrina Mahfouz and directed by Esther Richardson for Pilot Theatre.

The first book, Noughts and Crosses, was adapted for a third time and showed at Regent’s Park Open Air Theatre from 28 June to 26 July 2025. This production was adapted by Dominic Cooke and directed by Tinuke Craig, with Noah Valentine and Corinna Brown taking up the roles of Callum and Sephy.

=== Radio ===
The first book was also the subject of the last edition in February 2012 of BBC Radio 4's "Saturday Drama".

=== Television ===
In August 2016, the BBC announced that Noughts & Crosses would be dramatised for television. Being Human creator Toby Whithouse was involved in overseeing the scripts. Jay Z's company Roc Nation and Participant Media were executive producers for the series. In November 2018, it was announced that Masali Baduza and Jack Rowan were cast as Sephy Hadley and Callum McGregor, respectively. The first episode aired on BBC One on 5 March 2020, with the entire series made available on BBC iPlayer immediately afterwards. It is available in America on the Peacock streaming service.

=== Graphic novel ===
A graphic novel adaptation of the first novel was released circa 2015, adapted by Ian Edginton and illustrated by John Aggs.

== Critical reception ==
On 5 November 2019, BBC News included Noughts & Crosses on its list of the 100 most inspiring novels.

The Guardian ranked Noughts & Crosses #88 in its list of 100 Best Books of the 21st Century.

== Awards and nominations ==
- 2002, Lancashire Children's Book of the Year.
- 2002, Red House Children's Book Award.
- 2002, Sheffield Children's Book Award.
- 2003, Wirral Paperback of the Year Award.
- 2004, Fantastic Fiction Award.
- 2005, Berkshire Book Award (shortlist).
- 2005, Lancashire Children's Book of the Year (shortlist).
- 2005, Redbridge Teenage book Award (shortlist).
- 2006, Lancashire Children's Book of the Year (shortlist).
- 2006, Staffordshire Young People's Book of the Year.

== See also ==
- Fable (1965 TV play)
