= Pig-Heart Boy =

Children's novel

Pig Heart Boy
- First edition (UK)
- Author: Malorie Blackman
- Language: English
- Genre: Children's
- Publisher: Corgi Books (UK); Doubleday (US)
- Publication place: United Kingdom
- English publication date: 1997
- Pages: 256

Pig-Heart Boy is a children's novel by Malorie Blackman, which was first published in 1997. It shows the life of a teenage boy who undergoes a heart transplant. It was shortlisted for the Carnegie Medal and adapted into a television series, which was broadcast by Children's BBC in 1999. In 2025, the book was adapted onstage by Winsome Pinnock in a production at the Unicorn Theater directed by Tristan Fynn-Aiduenu.

== Plot summary ==
Thirteen-year-old Cameron Kelsey has a serious heart condition and needs a new heart. He gets the opportunity to get a new heart but it is a pig heart rather than a human heart. He undergoes the surgery, but it fails: the heart doesn't work, and he undergoes different surgeries.

== BBC television version ==
In 1999, the BBC made a six-part television adaptation of the novel. Although the television adaptation was overall quite faithful to the book, some aspects were changed, including some characters' names (for example, Dr. Bryce is labelled Professor Rae in the television version), and also the fact that Cam had not been the first patient to have had a pig transplant with Dr. Bryce/Professor Rae. The series also ended with Alex being born, while the book merely ends with Cam's decision to accept the second heart transplant.

The television adaptation won the BAFTA Award for Children's Drama in 2000.
