= Ian Kelsey =

English actor (born 1966)

- Born: 17 December 1966 (age 59); York, England
- Education: Guildford School of Acting
- Occupation: Actor
- Years active: 1993–present
- Television: Emmerdale; Casualty; Blue Murder; Down to Earth; Doctors; Coronation Street
- Spouse: Mia Terry (m. 2004; sep. 2016)
- Partner: Beth Cordingly
- Children: 2

Ian Kelsey (born 17 December 1966) is an English actor. He is known for his roles as Dave Glover in the ITV soap opera Emmerdale, Patrick Spiller in the BBC medical drama Casualty, DI Richard Mayne in the ITV crime drama Blue Murder and Howard Bellamy in the BBC soap opera Doctors. As well as appearing in the BBC drama Down to Earth, he also played Vinny Ashford in the ITV soap opera Coronation Street from 2016 to 2017.

== Early and personal life ==
Kelsey was born on 17 December 1966 in York. Before acting, Kelsey started his working life as an apprentice coach builder at York railway carriage works. He then trained at the Joseph Rowntree Theatre in York, later graduating from the Guildford School of Acting.

In 2004, Kelsey married fellow actress Mia Terry. They had two children together, as well as co-founding a drama school in Brighton. They separated in 2016. Since 2021, he has been in a relationship with actress Beth Cordingly.

== Career ==
In 1994, Kelsey was cast in the ITV soap opera Emmerdale as a series regular. He made his first appearance as Dave Glover in August 1994. Two years later, it was announced that he would be departing from the soap; he made his final appearance in December 1996. He joined BBC medical drama Casualty in 1999 as Patrick Spiller, in which he appeared until 2002. He then appeared in the BBC drama Down to Earth as Matt Brewer from 2003 to 2004. Kelsey then played DI Richard Mayne in the crime drama Blue Murder for six years.

On 3 September 2010, he guest starred in the BBC soap opera Doctors. Two years later, it was announced that Kelsey would be joining Doctors as new series regular Howard Bellamy. He made his first appearance on 28 May 2012. Kelsey left the medical drama on screen on 22 October 2015, to join Patrick Robinson in the UK touring stage production tour of The Shawshank Redemption. Kelsey joined Coronation Street in August 2016 playing the part of Vinny Ashford, a role he played until 2017.

== Filmography ==
| Year | Film | Role | Notes |
|---|---|---|---|
| 1993 | Covert Assassin | Narmco Clerk | Television film |
| 1994–1996 | Emmerdale | Dave Glover | Series regular |
| 1994 | Black Beauty | Joe Green (Older) | Film |
| 1998 | Men Behaving Badly | Karaoke Man | Episode: "Performance" |
| 1999–2002 | Casualty | Patrick Spiller | Series regular |
| 1999 | Touching Evil | Carl Laing | Episode: "Innocent: Part 2" |
| 2001 | Murder in Mind | Liam Taylor | Episode: "Vigilante" |
| 2001 | Holby City | Patrick Spiller | Episode: "It's a Family Affair" |
| 2003–2004 | Down to Earth | Matt | Main role |
| 2003–2009 | Blue Murder | DI Richard Mayne | Main role |
| 2005 | Angel of Death: The Beverly Allitt Story | David Crampton | Television film |
| 2005–2006 | Where the Heart Is | Adam Miller/Jack Clayton | TV series |
| 2008 | Dustbin Baby | Daniel Johnson | Television film |
| 2009 | The Bill | Brendan Newlyn | Episode: "Twist of Fate" |
| 2009 | The Weakest Link | Billy Flynn | Episode: "West End Theatre Special" |
| 2010 | Doctors | Alex Wakefield | Episode: "Hanging On" |
| 2012–2015 | Doctors | Howard Bellamy | Series regular |
| 2016–2017 | Coronation Street | Vinny Ashford | Recurring role |
| 2018 | Lovesick | James Hamilton | 1 episode |
| 2020 | Moving On | Barry | Episode: "Second Sight" |
| 2020 | Wuthering Heights | Heathcliff Earnshaw | Main role |
| 2021 | Innocent | Building Site Foreman | Recurring role |
| 2022 | The Suspect | CI Ward | 1 episode |
| 2023 | The Adventures of Sleepy the Magical Bear | Snorkel the Elephant (voice) | Film |

== Stage ==
| Year | Role | Show | Location | Ref. |
|---|---|---|---|---|
| 2003 | Same Time, Next Year | George Peters | Theatre Royal Windsor | |
| 2009 | Chicago | Billy Flynn | Cambridge Theatre | |
| 2015 | The Shawshank Redemption | Andy Dufrene | National Tour | |
| 2016 | Legally Blonde | Prof Callahan | Curve, Leicester | |

== Awards and nominations ==
| Year | Award | Category | Nominated work | Result | Ref. |
|---|---|---|---|---|---|
| 2013 | The British Soap Awards | Best Comedy Performance | Doctors | Nominated | |
| 2013 | The British Soap Awards | Sexiest Male | Doctors | Longlisted | |
| 2013 | Inside Soap Awards | Best Daytime Star | Doctors | Longlisted | |
| 2014 | The British Soap Awards | Best Actor | Doctors | Longlisted | |
| 2014 | Inside Soap Awards | Best Daytime Star | Doctors | Nominated | |
| 2016 | The British Soap Awards | Best On-Screen Partnership (with Dido Miles) | Doctors | Nominated | |
