= Casualty series 10 =

Tenth series of Casualty

Casualty
- Series 10
- Starring: Ian Bleasdale; Lisa Coleman; Sorcha Cusack; Sue Devaney; Robert Duncan; Jane Gurnett; Craig Kelly; Clive Mantle; Lizzy McInnerny; Jason Merrells; Patrick Robinson; Derek Thompson; Julia Watson
- No. of episodes: 24

Release
- Original network: BBC One
- Original release: 16 September 1995 – 24 February 1996

Series chronology
- ← Previous; Series 9 Next → Series 11

The tenth series of the British medical drama television series Casualty commenced airing in the United Kingdom on BBC One on 16 September 1995 and finished on 24 February 1996. Notable events of the series include Ash's marriage to Laura, Baz's affair with Charlie, Baz's pregnancy, and a gas explosion.

== Production ==
Corinne Hollingworth continued to steer Casualty as it entered its tenth series, navigating a television landscape increasingly crowded with fresh medical dramas. Despite formidable rivals like ER, Chicago Hope and the UK's own Cardiac Arrest, the show maintained its footing and proved its enduring appeal.

Love was blooming in Holby this series; Charlie and Baz reignited their long-lost flame, while Dr Mike Barratt found himself drawn to nurse Rachel. And in a finale filled with emotion and a touch of turbulence, Ash and PR officer Laura said "I do", but not without a few dramatic twists along the way. Redland Chapel in Bristol became the stage for Ash and Laura's on-screen union, with 135 extras packed into the pews to recreate the feel of a real wedding day.

== Cast ==
=== Overview ===
The tenth series of Casualty features a cast of characters working in the emergency department of Holby City Hospital. The series began with 10 roles with star billing, which was a significant increase from the previous series. Clive Mantle starred as emergency medicine consultant Mike Barratt. Julia Watson appeared as specialist registrar Barbara "Baz" Hayes. Derek Thompson continued his role as charge nurse Charlie Fairhead while Sorcha Cusack portrayed senior staff nurse Kate Wilson. Patrick Robinson, Jane Gurnett and Lisa Coleman appeared as staff nurses Martin "Ash" Ashford, Rachel Longworth and Jude Korcanik. Ian Bleasdale and Sue Devaney starred as paramedics Josh Griffiths and Liz Harker. Jason Merrells portrayed receptionist Matt Hawley.

Craig Kelly and Lizzy McInnerny began portraying senior house officer Daniel Perryman and public relations officer Laura Milburn in episode one. Both left the roles at the conclusion of the series. Robert Duncan was introduced in episode two as the hospital's non-executive director Peter Hayes. Michael N. Harbour, Gary Bakewell and David Robb joined the recurring cast as security guard Trevor Wilson, porter Tim Greenway and surgeon Henry Reeve-Jones in episodes three, eleven and thirteen respectively. Bakewell departed in episode twenty-two while Robb departed in episode twenty-three. Frank Grimes reprised his guest role of Matt's father, Brian Hawley, for five episodes between episode nine and episode fifteen. Gurnett and Robinson chose to leave the show, with the former departing in episode twenty-one and the latter departing at the conclusion of the series.

=== Main characters ===
- Ian Bleasdale as Josh Griffiths
- Lisa Coleman as Jude Korcanik
- Sorcha Cusack as Kate Wilson
- Sue Devaney as Liz Harker
- Robert Duncan as Peter Hayes (episodes 2−20)
- Jane Gurnett as Rachel Longworth (until episode 21)
- Craig Kelly as Daniel Perryman (episodes 1−24)
- Clive Mantle as Mike Barratt (until episode 21)
- Lizzy McInnerny as Laura Milburn (episodes 1−24)
- Jason Merrells as Matt Hawley
- Patrick Robinson as Martin "Ash" Ashford (until episode 24)
- Derek Thompson as Charlie Fairhead
- Julia Watson as Barbara "Baz" Hayes

=== Recurring and guest characters ===
- Gary Bakewell as Tim Greenway (episodes 11−22)
- Letitia Dean as Hannah Chesney (episode 9)
- Frank Grimes as Brian Hawley (episodes 9−15)
- Michael N. Harbour as Trevor Wilson (from episode 3)
- David Robb as Henry Reeve-Jones (episodes 13−23)

== Episodes ==
No. overall	No. in series	Title	Directed by	Written by	Original release date	UK viewers (millions)
153	1	"Family Values"	Chris Lovett	Lisa Evans	16 September 1995	—
Jude meets with Daniel Perryman, the department's new SHO. Mike has returned to the department, his marriage over for good, but Baz, who is now conducting an affair with Charlie, has been asked to stay on as senior registrar. A journalist is sent to cover an athletics event, even though she is more interested in allegations of substandard building work at the stadium. One of the runners meets with her biological mother; her foster brother has told her his parents can no longer look after her. She chases him under the stands when he is caught stealing, but accidental damage caused by the careless building contractors has damaged the stands, which collapse. Her foster parents stand by her. Mike takes Rachel to the stadium to assess the damage. The journalist is ejected from the hospital by new PR officer Laura Milburn, but when the builder's son, on learning a friend of his was killed in the collapse, tells her everything. Guest starring David Roderick, Kevin Quarmby and Glen Berry
154	2	"Money for Nothing"	Catherine Morshead	Rob Gittins	23 September 1995	—
A couple are planning to sell their farm, but the husband's dimwitted brother is determined to hold on to it. After causing an accident, which contaminates a school's water supply, he takes an inspector hostage in the hay loft and causes him to be impaled on some farm machinery. After taking him to hospital, the couple decide to keep the farm but are unaware the brother has set fire to a barn for the insurance and become caught in the inferno. A woman who tripped in the street accuses Daniel of stealing her ring, but Charlie and Baz learn her husband swapped it for a fake some time ago and she admits to having faked the theft. A man who collapsed at works admits he has AIDS and is debating whether to cash in his life insurance. Baz takes the post and arranges to meet up with Charlie. Both Matt and Daniel show an interest in new radiographer Angie, who arranges to meet them both at the same time. Guest starring Arkie Whiteley, Adam Kotz, Pip Donaghy, Vicky Ogden, Russell Boulter, Trevor Cooper and Christine Pollon
155	3	"Sacrifice"	Matthew Evans	Keith Temple	30 September 1995	—
A Romanian woman picks up a boy from school before his mother can do so. When she shouts at him, he runs off and trips over, while she is hit by a bus. At the hospital, it is revealed she is his biological mother and gave him up for adoption to protect him. His adoptive mother agrees she can keep seeing him. Two teenage boys are brought in after a fire at an arcade: One turns out to be Kate's son Nick. Things are tense at home since her husband Trevor was forced to take early retirement. Charlie and Ash are forced to announce further cuts, while Charlie feels uncomfortable when he meets Peter for the first time and likes him. A mentally disturbed man is injured after stopping his mother getting rid of his ferrets. When the ambulance turns up, he takes Liz hostage in the barn. She manages to escape and is angry that Josh didn't call the police. Guest starring Rosalie Crutchley, Galit Hershkovitz, Carolyn Pickles, Mark Buffery and Ian Staples
156	4	"Outside Bulwayo"	Robert Gabriel	Ashley Pharoah	7 October 1995	—
An elderly ex-colonial officer is staying at his son's house; he is getting on well with his grandson but his son resents the fact he spent his childhood at a boarding school in England. When he is taken ill, he admits he sent his son away because he wanted his wife to himself. Since he has recently returned from Zimbabwe, the staff believe he has malaria but Rachel realises he actually has Weil's disease from fishing at the canal. He asks his son to go back to Africa with him but dies. Laura shadows the A&E staff for a shift. A man comes in requesting a male nurse; he has glued a wig to his head at the wrong angle. He allows Kate to remove it and they get on so well that he asks her out; she explains she is happily married. A couple of animal rights protestors plant a bomb in the car of a scientist conducting medical experiments on animals, but when his young daughter gets into the car instead the man goes to help her and they are both injured in the explosion. He leaves the hospital rather than receive medical treatment that has been tested on animals, even though he will likely die of his injuries. The scientist recognises his girlfriend and she is arrested; Laura is injured in the scuffle. To Jude's disgust, Ash takes her out for a drink and they go back to her place. Guest starring Frederick Treves, Belinda Sinclair, William Chubb and Rob Edwards
157	5	"Halfway House"	Ian White	David Joss Buckley	14 October 1995	—
At a home for the mentally ill, a distressed young woman accuses an older man who innocently bought her some chocolate of abusing her; the argument between the pair results in a gas explosion; the manager of the home suffers minor injuries, but the young woman is badly injured and dies just after reaching hospital. Daniel mistakenly believes that the man is her brother and shows her into a room with the woman's mother, who had believed her claims and berates him; he runs off and steps in front of a train, dying soon after arriving in hospital. A man comes in believing he has throat cancer; he turns out to have a fishbone stuck in his throat and Daniel discharges him once it's removed but Mike calls him back in for a referral. A group of elderly people help out with a paramedical training exercise by posing as the victims of a bus crash; Liz is upset when one of them, an aspiring actor, gets too into character and grabs her. One of the women suffers a genuine heart attack and is taken to hospital; she and her friend, who have been competing over the actor, are upset to find his stories of his past are exaggerated. Jude feels Ash's relationship with Laura makes him unsuitable as union rep. Charlie is frustrated to witness Baz and Peter sharing an anniversary meal. Guest starring John Bluthal, Christian Rodska, Tracy Gillman, David Ross, Patsy Byrne, Polly Jo Pleasence and William Russell
158	6	"Compensation"	Ken Horn	Joanne Maguire	21 October 1995	—
A group of cyclists are involved in an altercation with a sports car driver, who is dating the ex-girlfriend of one of the lead cyclists. He ends up causing an accident in which a number of cyclists suffer minor injuries but his girlfriend stands by him. The mother of a boy with cerebral palsy is trying to sue the hospital where he was born for negligence but loses the case. In the meantime, her husband takes the boy into hospital with an infection and Ash convinces her to focus her efforts on caring for him. Her solicitor runs over an old lady and takes her to hospital where she collapses herself; she is pregnant and makes peace with her boyfriend, who wants her to reduce her workload. Trevor applies for a job as head of security at the hospital and clearly has history with Matt. Ash tells Jude he is standing down as union rep, while Charlie confides in Rachel about his affair with Baz. Guest starring Alphonsia Emmanuel, Tam Williams, Ben Hull, Donald Gee, Sally Faulkner, Cyril Nri and Jon Croft
159	7	"Turning Point"	Tony McHale	Tony McHale	28 October 1995	—
Jude is nominated by Matt and Ash to replace Ash as shop steward. Kay, a teenage girl who was brought in after a drug overdose, runs off with a sick baby while nurse Sarah is distracted. Kay's mother reveals that Kay's baby died without being christened and Josh finds her christening the baby in a church. Ash is annoyed when Laura sends Sarah home. Daniel discharges a sick woman against Rachel's advice; she is later brought back in and her husband threatens to sue Daniel, who apologises to Rachel. A retiring policeman is bothered by his young partner's corrupt actions, including planting evidence on a rapist. When she makes a mess of a raid on a group of illegal immigrants and a girl is injured, he decides to report her, even though he will go down with her. Charlie tries to end his affair with Baz but she comes to his flat and seduces him. Guest starring Emily Woof, Campbell Morrison, Josie d'Arby and Shirley Stelfox
160	8	"Battling On"	Geoff Feld	Ann Marie Di Mambro	4 November 1995	—
A bouncer comes home from work and finds his mother has bought his younger brother a new computer. When the mother gets a phone call saying her son has been beaten up, she assumes it is the older one but in fact it is the younger son; she has been selling prescription drugs to raise money and he was beaten up by local drug dealers as a warning. Jude questions Charlie about cuts only to be told the reason for them. A man waits until his wife and daughter have left home then dresses up in women's clothing; he falls down the stairs and is found by a window cleaner. At the hospital, his wife accepts his lifestyle. A member of the Salvation Army is having a relationship with a woman that his commander disapproves of. He crashes his car, resulting in his father being slightly injured, and announces he is leaving the army. Charlie calls Social Services when a girl with an injured foot is left alone at the hospital while her mother goes for a job interview. Peter is at the hospital organising a fundraiser and Charlie calls things off with Baz again when she cancels a date to see Peter's mother. Guest starring Anne Myatt, Gwyneth Strong, John Abineri, Richard Hampton and Annie Hulley
161	9	"Hit and Run"	Rob Evans	Billy Hamon	11 November 1995	—
A man dies in Baz's care after being misdiagnosed by his GP and travelling 50 miles to the hospital because of new policies; his wife threatens to sue. Barmaid Hannah heads off to work, leaving her son Stephen with his stepfather Tony. A man in the bar, Phil, sees his sister-in-law Angie buying drugs and forcibly drives her to hospital. Stephen is hit by a car after running out into the road; it turns out Tony beat him for wetting the bed and Hannah throws Tony out. Phil is suspected of the hit and run but the culprit is a senior surgeon who was driving despite having a brain tumour. Phil and Angie are arrested anyway when it is found he was drink driving. An elderly woman comes in confused and speaks of having to see the Queen; after Daniel discharges her, it is discovered she sang at the Queen's birthday in 1959. Josh and Liz make their peace. Matt's father Brian visits him and Matt lends him some money. Guest starring Letitia Dean, Rupert Holliday-Evans, Liz Smith, David Bradley, Camilla Power and Rosie Cavaliero
162	10	"When All Else Fails"	David Innes Edwards	Tom Needham	18 November 1995	—
A jockey tells his parent he is moving out, then learns his girlfriend is pregnant. He takes laxatives to lose weight before a race but is killed when he falls from his horse. Kate advises his girlfriend to go to his parents for support but they refuse to accept the baby is his. An elderly woman is about to bury her husband and tells her son she intends to give the life insurance to his sister to set up her business. She then suffers a stroke and her son asks the staff not to treat her, since their father ended up as a vegetable, but her daughter tells Baz and Ash to put her on a ventilator. She later changes her mind but Baz says turning off the ventilator would be actively killing her and refuses. A pair of travellers bring in the woman's daughter, who has an injured ankle; Daniel misdiagnoses her and Charlie and Rachel have to reset it. Her mother has terminal cancer and admits she had the girl as a surrogate for her sister then ran off with her. Her partner, who walked out on his own family, agrees to help find her family and look after the girl. Matt is surprised when Brian not only returns his money but gives extra for his birthday. Ash is uncomfortable about Laura's plans for a charity ball. Charlie rejects overtures from Baz and leaves with Zoe Ross. Guest starring Pauline Yates, Aisling McGuckin, Ben Walden and Bernard Horsfall
163	11	"Release"	Indra Bhose	David Richard-Fox	25 November 1995	—
A vicar visits the hospital to comfort a grieving mother. He later performs a wedding service but the gay best man attempts to pressure him into coming out as gay. He hangs himself in the rectory and dies in hospital. The Vicar's housekeeper blames the gay best man for his death and tells him that the vicar was celibate. Kate and Rachel look after one of a group of builders working at the hospital when he collapses with a heart condition. A young man starting working at a prison is being driven in by his parents; his father pressures him into helping chase a robber and, although he escapes, the pursuit results in a car crashing into the stationary vehicle where his mother is sitting. He decides to give up on trying to live up to his father's expectations. Rachel befriends patient Tim Greenway. Daniel learns he is being sued for misdiagnosis and Baz tells Charlie she has left Peter. Trevor is angry about a spate of thefts in the department. Guest starring Kevin Dyer, Dominic Guard, Declan Mulholland, Mona Bruce and Barry Stanton
164	12	"Bringing It All Back Home"	Michael Owen Morris	Rob Gittins	2 December 1995	—
A reunion is held among the Holby City FC team who reached the cup final. Two former players, Tom and Pat, are worried by the presence of old team-mate Bob; the three of them were bribed to throw the final. Bob has seen the fictional account in Tom's autobiography and wants to expose it. A feud between rival yacht owners sees the yacht containing the players collide with an empty boat; Tom saves Bob from being crushed. Tom dies of a heart attack in hospital and Bob keeps quiet. The two rivals end up in hospital when a fight lands them both in the water; their children take charge of the businesses and call a truce. A woman comes in with an injured wrist; the staff are suspicious of her over-protective son but it transpires her husband walked out after learning their daughter isn't his and out of guilt she has been self-harming and buying extravagant presents for the children. Matt's dad Brian is admitted after a fight at work, Josh tells Matt the truth, Brian is not at work but at a hostel and got the injury because he was on a bender. Trevor puts an electronic lock on the staff room door to prevent thefts but when people keep forgetting the code Charlie writes it down and Rachel's watch is stolen. Tim visits Rachel while a stern Matt gives a drunken Brian money to stop him going home. Baz tells Charlie Peter wants to adopt; he agrees to resume their affair if she tells Peter the truth. Guest starring John Wheatley, Ian Hogg, Amy Marston, Stephen Yardley, Gareth Thomas and Michael Keating
165	13	"All's Fair" (Note: See also "All's Fair" series 5, "All's Fair" series 16 & "All's Fair in Love and War" series 20)	Sharon Miller	Keith Temple	9 December 1995	—
A boxer is told to throw a fight by his trainer on the orders of a local criminal family; he does so when his brother is threatened but suffers head injuries and dies in hospital. His trainer and brother blame the other boxer. A group of students go out after a party, leaving their flatmate alone. He unknowingly eats a cake made with marijuana and throws himself out of a window. He recovers in hospital and the girl who made the cake apologises to him. A former army nurse who believes she has Gulf War Syndrome deliberately drives her car into a lorry; her husband, a fellow soldier, has been following the army's line that the condition does not exist but Baz convinces him to talk to her, their baby son Wesley is later diagnosed with hearing loss after Kate noticed that he wasn't reacting to noise from building work in the department. Tim turns up claiming a television set fell on him and tells the staff he and Rachel are dating in secret. Trevor arranges for security guards to escort the staff to their cars. Laura has the programmes for the ball printed but they fail to mention Peter's company. Charlie speaks with Peter and realises Baz has not said anything to him; Charlie tears a strip off Baz and leaves with Zoe. Guest starring Kevin Dyer, Niall Toibin, Simon Fenton and Joe Absolom
166	14	"Shame the Devil"	Rob Evans	David Joss Buckley	16 December 1995	—
At a public school, a boy is accused by a gang leader of reporting one of the gang for shoplifting. He is chased and falls into a quarry. The gang leader tries to pin the blame on the boy's friend but the truth is uncovered, as is the fact he did the shoplifting himself and framed the other boy, and he is arrested. Mike invites Rachel to go to the charity ball with him and Ash asks Laura. Matt bets Daniel he can't get a date and Daniel gets turned down by Jude. A man goes back to work after an operation and discovers a co-worker has been dealing with one of his clients. The client asks him to get some football tickets, which he does but then collapses from a post-operative blood clot. He decides to take redundancy and gives the tickets to his rival. Mike blasts both surgeon Henry Reeve-Jones and Daniel for not prescribing an anticoagulant. Guest starring Neil McCaul, Stephen Tate, Roger Brierley, Michael Angelis and Nigel Humphreys
167	15	"Lost Boys"	Robert Gabriel	Ashley Pharoah	23 December 1995	—
A drunk driver causes an accident after a Christmas party and the female driver of the other vehicle is killed. PC Tony Poulson, attending the scene, tells Kate his wife was killed in similar circumstances two years previous. A minibus containing a group of choirboys is blinded by a tarpaulin at the scene and crashes into the river. One of the boys is washed away but John and Liz later find him. The priest with the group suffers a crisis of faith but finds his purpose restored when he helps a boy with Tourette's, who ran away from an orphanage after the other boys picked on him. Matt has caught Brian red handed after trying to steal medical supplies in the department and warns Brian if he steals anything in the department, he will report him to the police. Tim comes to the hospital and tries to get Rachel to spend Christmas with him. Baz discovers she is pregnant; Rachel finds out and Baz tells her Peter isn't the father. Charlie and Baz attend the charity ball with Zoe and Peter respectively, and Ash and Laura make their relationship public. Guest starring Gaynor Barrett, Bruce Alexander and Jonathan Guy Lewis
168	16	"Castles in the Air"	Laurence Moody	Andrew Holden	30 December 1995	—
Jude discovers her bag has been stolen. Matt realises Brian is behind the thefts and forces him to return it. Trevor and Kate learn what has been going on; Matt gives Brian a train ticket and tells him to leave town. Mike is angry when one of Daniel's patients is admitted to a ward ahead of one of his because of having an influential GP; he has a go at Reeve-Jones but Peter warns him Reeve-Jones is a dangerous enemy to make. An old woman dies in hospital after slipping on a potato and falling down the stairs; Daniel tries to explain to her husband, who has dementia, what happened. Josh and Liz are being dogged by a fake paramedic. When a young boy is stranded on a country road having an asthma attack and the 999 call gives the wrong location, the imposter finds them and gives the boy an injection of adrenaline, causing him to have a heart attack. The hospital staff save him but the boy's father goes after the imposter and runs him over; they are both arrested. Rachel finds Tim working as a porter at the hospital: He tells her they can be together now he is a colleague rather than an ex-patient. Guest starring Ivan Kaye, Paul Copley, Iain Cuthbertson and Terry Molloy
169	17	"We Shall Overcome"	Ken Horn	Christopher Reason	6 January 1996	—
A man named Derek, who has been repairing cars outside his house, is served an injunction by his neighbours telling him to stop his work. He briefly holds them at gunpoint before falling onto a toolbox and impaling himself. One of the neighbours, a junior surgeon on Reeve-Jones' staff, overrules Josh and Liz and gives instructions which nearly cost Derek's life; Mike clashes with Reeve-Jones again. Another neighbour, who was a reluctant figurehead for the injunction, decides to support Derek on learning he has been struggling since his garage went bankrupt. Reeve-Jones is already under fire because of revelations that the Trust is financially involved with an arms firm run by his brother; a protest is being held outside the hospital. Matt tells Jude the truth about the thefts while Baz tells Peter she's leaving him. An elderly couple are visited by their daughter and grandson; the daughter is bitter that her mother was always pursuing charitable causes instead of giving her attention when she was a child, and blames her when her son takes her anti-depression pills. He recovers in hospital but a reconciliation is prevented by the mother instead joining the protest outside. Guest starring Jane Lapotaire, Matthew Scurfield, John Franklyn-Robbins and Kate Lonergan
170	18	"Land of Hope"	Ken Horn	Billy Hamon	13 January 1996	—
An Asian schoolgirl is struck in the face with a glass bottle after leaving school. She tells Baz she has recently had an abortion. It turns out her brother carried out the attack after seeing nude photos of her in a magazine (which was how she raised the money). Ash shows him her scarred face and she decides that having to see what he has done to her every day is punishment enough. Baz tells Charlie about her pregnancy and that he is the father. A middle-aged man is found collapsed at home by his teenage daughter, and Daniel has to lead the resuscitation. His daughter is guilty, since she told him about her mother having an affair with a younger man. The mother returns to her family. A mysterious man turns up claiming to have won the National Lottery and wants to donate half a million pounds to the hospital; however, his wife turns up and reveals he is a fantasist. Rachel is receiving intimidating silent phone calls and believes Tim is behind them. Jude criticises the Trust's actions to journalists outside the hospital. Laura initially chastises her but then gives the press the full story. Ash proposes to Laura. Guest starring Parminder Nagra, Navin Chowdhry, Stuart Organ, Lee Ross and Milton Johns
171	19	"For Your Own Good"	Rob Evans	Lisa Evans	20 January 1996	—
A Kurdish asylum seeker is being transported from a detention centre when he jumps out of a moving car. At the hospital, x-rays show evidence he was tortured. Jude tries to get him legal help but he is attacked by his guard while phoning a lawyer and threatens to jump off the roof. Jude nearly talks him down but, when the guard approaches him, he loses his balance and falls to his death. A teenage girl makes a fuss at home and causes her mother to fall off a ladder. The girl's father has Huntington's disease and she is worried he might have passed it on to her: She agrees to get tested. Elderly spinster twins Hope and Monica are approached by a middle-aged man, Ellis; Hope threatens him with a gun but Monica tackles her, causing Hope to be shot in the foot. Ellis is Monica's son: She was forced to give him up for adoption and was told he was dead, and despite Hope's wishes she gets to know him. Reeve-Jones is on the warpath and Laura accepts Ash's proposal. Baz tells Charlie she will tell Peter the truth when he gets back from his mother's. Tim resigns after Rachel reports him but then approaches her in the car park, acting as though they're a couple. Mike chases him off and tells Rachel he loves her; they kiss and leave together. Guest starring Avi Nassa, Raymond Trickitt, Gabrielle Hamilton, Clive Russell, Sharon Duce and Rosie Cavaliero
172	20	"Asking for Miracles"	Roger Gartland	Joanne Maguire	27 January 1996	—
Mike and Rachel have spent the night together but afterwards Rachel is harassed by Tim. He later turns up at the hospital after taking an overdose and refuses counselling. Mike resigns on learning the board are going to support Reeve-Jones; he takes a job in Africa with Doctors Without Borders and asks Rachel to go with him. A traveller is planning to move on over the objections of his blind wife and teenage daughter; he tries to drag his daughter away from school and in the fracas his wife is hit in the head by a car door. At the hospital, it is discovered her blindness, which she thought was the result of diabetes, is actually Cataracts and therefore reversible: She convinces her husband to stay. A worker on a building site has bet all his money on horses despite his wife being threatened by loan sharks. He is distracted when he hears on the radio that he lost and hits a co-worker with a concrete block, killing him. His wife leaves him. Two young professionals have been out drinking all night and the woman starts vomiting blood during a presentation. Her boyfriend is convinced to try to give up his heavy drinking lifestyle. Peter comes to see Charlie to ask what is going on with Baz; Baz tells him of their affair and her pregnancy. Ash is visited by his father Frank who is unhappy about him marrying Laura. Guest starring Tim McInnerny, Oscar James, Tony Rohr, Linda Bassett, Holly Davidson and Mark Lambert
173	21	"Subject to Contract"	Catherine Morshead	Gillian Richmond	3 February 1996	—
A man, Phil has been contacted by his estranged wife Pam, who left him for another woman, Helen, while pregnant. Helen is angry with Pam but she feels Phil has the right to know their daughter Daisy has leukaemia. Pam, who is due to donate bone marrow, is hit by a motorcycle while arguing with Helen. Although she is likely to recover, she will be unable to donate so Helen goes to Phil for help, despite worrying she will be pushed out. Jude learns Daniel is taking anti-depressants and asks Baz to help him. A teenage boy goes jogging in his underwear in the middle of the night and sprains his ankle. His father tries to ignore his strange behaviour but, at the hospital, he takes his mother and Kate hostage with a knife and says he hears voices. Kate is annoyed when Trevor bursts into the cubicle and overpowers him; the staff suspect he has schizophrenia. A girl working at an old people's home takes an elderly man in for a check-up only for him to die suddenly. Rachel decides to go with Mike and they slip away quietly while the rest of the staff are celebrating Ash and Laura's engagement. Guest starring Kelly Hunter, Stephanie Fayerman, Trevor Byfield and Indra Ové
174	22	"Cheatin' Hearts"	Chris Lovett	Rob Gittins	10 February 1996	—
A woman named Karen convinces her friend Danni to spy on her boyfriend Tony, who works in a restaurant and who she believes is having an affair with a colleague, Vicki. Danni quickly realizes nothing is going on but Tony comforts Vicki when a customer gropes her; Karen sees them together, drives her car at them and crashes. Danni tells Tony what happened and he breaks up with Karen. A man named Len takes his family to see his mother and is angry to find his brother Barry is moving in with her. A fight between the two brothers sees Barry bang his head; at the hospital, Len learns Barry has terminal cancer. Tim turns up and convinces Daniel to give him Rachel's temporary address. Baz learns Daniel misdiagnosed a patient and he is sent home after breaking down. A youngster named Steve tries to get his friend Michael to help him steal a car. He does it on his own but crashes after realising there is a baby in the back seat. Michael steals Charlie's car to find Steve, whose injuries have been exacerbated by diabetes, and gets him to hospital. The police sergeant running the investigation turns out to be Steve's father and he convinces Charlie not to press charges against Michael. Guest starring Dorian Lough, Cathy Murphy and Ruth Hudson
175	23	"That Way Lies Ruin"	Diana Patrick	Keith Temple	17 February 1996	—
An elderly woman, Maud, has been mugged. Neighbour Walter Fisher tells her husband Ronald that a local youth, Eric, was responsible, then leads a gang of vigilantes in attacking and badly beating Eric. Ronald tries to help the youngster but suffers a stroke; Walter takes Ronald to hospital where he gets Ash to send an ambulance for Eric. Ronald realises Walter blamed Eric because the family offends his sensibilities and suffers another stroke that leaves him comatose when Maud tells him the real mugger has been caught. Schoolgirl Emma babysits for school bus driver Adrian. Her classmate Joanne once did the same but was fired for making a pass at Adrian. Jealous, she leads a gang of girls in bullying Emma, which results in Emma falling from the upper storey window of the school bus. A married man is planning to run away with his girlfriend but they are trapped in a lift at the airport and he falls down the lift shaft trying to get them out. He is left paralysed and tells Kate to call his wife in order to get rid of his girlfriend. However, he then tells her he was leaving her and his girlfriend returns to his side. An old friend of Matt's tries to get him to sell stolen goods but he refuses. The friend steals his bike but Trevor gets it back for him. Daniel admits to Baz that he isn't cut out for medicine. Guest starring Timothy Bateson, Sheila Shand Gibbs and Denis Lill
176	24	"Night Moves"	David Innes Edwards	David Joss Buckley	24 February 1996	18.05
Ash argues with Frank on the eve of his wedding and goes into work; several staff have been called in because of a flu epidemic among the night shift. Laura goes to see Frank and tells him what happened with Reeve-Jones and how they might have to move away to avoid repercussions; Frank is impressed and agrees to attend the wedding. Ageing comics Jerry Allen and Bobby Zee are being driven around their old haunts by chauffeur Kay; Jerry wants to revive their act but Bobby is still bitter over an argument over his girlfriend, who left him for Jerry, decades previous. A fight between the two men distracts Kay, causing her to run over a man jogging in the middle of the night then crash into a car containing a woman in labour and her husband, prompting a pile-up. Liz has to deliver the baby on her own and the girl is named after her. The jogger's wife explains he hasn't slept properly since their daughter died: He may have to have his legs amputated. Kay, who seemed fine, collapses on Josh and dies, having suffered a head injury. Jerry is disgusted by Bobby's lack of compassion and obsession with his own minor facial cut, announcing he's realised he was glad to be shot of him. It is Daniel's last day and he saves a young girl who swallowed a pen from choking. Trevor chases after a mentally disturbed man who disappeared from the department but falls down some steps; Kate is left performing a bedside vigil. Baz shows Charlie the first ultrasound scan of their baby; at the end of Ash and Laura's wedding, they share a significant look. Guest starring Oscar James, Freddie Davies and Don Henderson

== Bibliography ==
- Kingsley, Hilary (1995). Casualty: The Inside Story. Penguin Books. ISBN 0-14-024902-8.
