= Casualty series 17 =

Seventeenth series of Casualty

Casualty
- Series 17
- Starring: Adjoa Andoh; Ian Bleasdale; Russell Boulter; Louise Brealey; Christopher Colquhoun; Kelly Harrison; Kwame Kwei-Armah; Martina Laird; Simon MacCorkindale; Sarah Manners; Will Mellor; Dan Rymer; Zita Sattar; Cathy Shipton; Christine Stephen-Daly; Derek Thompson; Matthew Wait; Lee Warburton
- No. of episodes: 40

Release
- Original network: BBC One
- Original release: 14 September 2002 – 21 June 2003

Series chronology
- ← Previous; Series 16 Next → Series 18

The seventeenth series of the British medical drama television series Casualty commenced airing in the United Kingdom on BBC One on 14 September 2002 and finished on 21 June 2003.

== Production ==
Richard Handford takes over from Mervyn Watson as series producer, having previously worked on Emmerdale and The Bill. Watson became executive producer alongside Mal Young. Once again, 40 episodes were commissioned.

Public support for Casualty remained high, achieving on average 9 million viewers each week in the previous series. Co-executive producer Mal Young was keen to reward loyal fans this series, by promising that "the pace and intensity of the show will stay high."

The opening episode "Déjà Vu", features a major incident after an air ambulance helicopter crashes at a fairground. Handford advises "Part of the crash was filmed in a London studio and the rest on location in Wiltshire". The episode was technically challenging, taking 6 months to film at Grittleton House, with around 800 extras used for the fairground scenes.

Part way through the series, the production moved to a new location for exterior shots of the hospital building and A&E entrance. Allen House, part of the Ashley Down Centre campus at City of Bristol College, served as the location for most exterior shots of the hospital's A&E entrance from series 1 until episode 15 where a car crashes into the canopy. From episode 16, scenes were shot on a new exterior set constructed at Lawrence Hill Industrial Park, Bristol.

The series finale and 400th episode "A Special Day", features a large-scale stunt coinciding with the wedding of characters Jack and Nikki. Filmed at Mardyke Wharf in Bristol, the production involved the controlled explosion of a canal barge, with an estimated cost of £70,000. Preparation for the stunt took approximately four weeks, and the detonation was reportedly audible two miles away.

== Cast ==
=== Overview ===
The seventeenth series of Casualty features a cast of characters working in the emergency department of Holby City Hospital and Holby Ambulance Service. Fifteen cast members from the previous series reprise their roles in this series.

Simon MacCorkindale stars as emergency medicine consultant and clinical director Harry Harper, Christopher Colquhoun as specialist registrar in emergency medicine Simon Kaminski and Christine Stephen-Daly as senior house officer Lara Stone.

Derek Thompson continues his role as clinical nurse manager Charlie Fairhead, Cathy Shipton as sister Lisa "Duffy" Duffin, and Adjoa Andoh as senior staff nurse Colette Kierney. Zita Sattar, Dan Rymer and Louise Brealey continue as staff nurses Anna Paul, Dillon Cahill and Roxanne "Roxy" Bird.

Ian Bleasdale, Kwame Kwei-Armah and Martina Laird continue their roles as paramedics Josh Griffiths, Finlay Newton and Comfort Jones with Kelly Harrison as ambulance technician Nikki Marshall. Will Mellor stars as receptionist Jack Vincent and Lee Warburton continues as his brother and emergency department assistant Tony Vincent.

Russell Boulter joins in episode 2 as security guard Ryan Johnson with Sarah Manners arriving as receptionist Bex Reynolds in episode 22. Matthew Wait arrives in episode 32 as Bex's ex-husband and paramedic Luke Warren. Shipton along with Boulter depart in episode 31. Shipton on leaving the show for a second time commented "I will definitely miss Casualty. I feel really proud to have contributed to the show." Andoh leaves the series in episode 38, with Mellor, Rymer and Warburton all leaving at the conclusion of the series.

The series features several recurring characters. Nicole Faraday stars as locum senior house officer Heather Lincoln. Liz Carling first appears as neurologist Selena Donovan with Bob Mason reprising his role as paramedic duty officer Jeff McGuire. N'deaya Baa Clements stars as Simon's girlfriend Jane Winters, Philip Martin Brown as Jack and Tony's father Eddie Vincent and Orlando Seale as house officer Merlin Jameson. Francesca Isherwood portrays Harry's daughter Kizzy Harper.

=== Main characters ===
- Adjoa Andoh as Colette Griffiths (until episode 38)
- Ian Bleasdale as Josh Griffiths
- Russell Boulter as Ryan Johnson (episodes 3−31)
- Louise Brealey as Roxy Bird
- Christopher Colquhoun as Simon Kaminski
- Kelly Harrison as Nikki Marshall
- Kwame Kwei-Armah as Fin Newton
- Martina Laird as Comfort Jones
- Simon MacCorkindale as Harry Harper
- Sarah Manners as Bex Reynolds (from episode 22)
- Will Mellor as Jack Vincent (until episode 40)
- Dan Rymer as Dillon Cahill (until episode 40)
- Zita Sattar as Anna Paul
- Cathy Shipton as Lisa "Duffy" Duffin (until episode 31)
- Christine Stephen-Daly as Lara Stone
- Derek Thompson as Charlie Fairhead
- Matthew Wait as Luke Warren (from episode 32)
- Lee Warburton as Tony Vincent (until episode 40)

=== Recurring characters ===
- Liz Carling as Selena Donovan (episodes 25−30)
- N'deaya Baa Clements as Jane Winters (episodes 16−34)
- Nicole Faraday as Heather Lincoln (episodes 2−10)
- Francesca Isherwood as Kizzy Harper (episodes 1−28)
- Philip Martin Brown as Eddie Vincent (episodes 7−34)
- Lisa Palfrey as Melanie Collier (episodes 2−9)
- Orlando Seale as Merlin Jameson (episodes 17−35)
- Paul Sharma as Vinnay Ramdas (episodes 35−40)

=== Guest characters ===
- Radhika Aggarwal as Anu (episode 2)
- Ian Aspinall as Mubbs Hussein (episode 2)
- Nicola Bertram as Penny List (episodes 35−36)
- Frankie Carson as Jordan Harper (episode 1)
- Sean Gilder as DI Langer (episodes 21−22)
- Natalie Glover as Emma Davies (episodes 20−21)
- Seeta Indrani as Emma Jackson (episodes 12 and 15)
- Beverley Klein as Lyn Paul (episodes 23−34)
- Rosalind Knight as Kate Duffin (episodes 2−3)
- Judy Loe as Jan Goddard (episode 9)
- Bob Mason as Jeff McGuire (episodes 2, 4 and 25)
- Ashley Miller as WPC Paula Newcombe (episodes 2 and 13)
- David Paisley as Ben Saunders (episodes 21−26)
- Tim Plester as Derek Moberley (episode 35)
- Michael Praed as Chris Meredith (episode 34)
- Melissa Pryer as Liza Davies (episodes 20−21)
- Tarek Ramini as PC Russell (episodes 9−29)
- David Robb as Henry Reeve-Jones (episode 18)
- Lynda Rooke as Beth Harper (episodes 1 and 13−27)
- Maggie Tagney as Stella Bird (episode 6)
- Gareth Thomas as Jim Bailey (episode 11)
- Nick Tizzard as PC McCormack (episodes 3−23)
- Ashlie Walker as Tally Harper (episodes 1, 14 and 27−33)
- Victoria Wicks as QC Mrs. Connolly (episodes 2−4)

== Episodes ==
| No. overall | No. in series | Title | Directed by | Written by | Original release date | UK viewers (millions) |
|---|---|---|---|---|---|---|
| 361 | 1 | "Déjà Vu" (Note: See also "Déjà Vu" series 11) | Frank W. Smith | David Joss Buckley | 14 September 2002 | 8.84 |
Harry takes his children to a charity funfair but ends up clashing with eldest daughter Tally, who is planning to drop out of school and go backpacking with her boyfriend Hugh, although Hugh is shocked to learn she is only sixteen. A skydive goes wrong when one of the parachutists, John, collides with a bungee jumper and, in a panic, releases his harness and falls several feet to the ground. With ambulances delayed by traffic, Harry calls in an air ambulance but when it tries to take off, the discarded parachute gets stuck in its rotors and it crashes, causing injuries to several bystanders including Jordan. A major incident is called but Roxy, now a staff nurse, has to go home to look after Nicole. Tally organises her siblings in performing triage on the walking wounded. One of the paramedics, Ben, and the pilot were killed instantly. The other paramedic, Terry, dies at the scene and Harry has to amputate the leg of a doctor, Eddie. John dies in hospital and Jordan is upset Harry didn't look after him but Tally decides not to go travelling. Harry's wife Beth is helping Lara with her defence. Duffy has received Andrew's life insurance and Charlie tries to talk her out of giving it away. Nikki is back at work after her stabbing and learns of Jack's proposal, which she jokingly accepts knowing he changed his mind. She and Josh talk down a couple arguing after a road accident, but when they are called to the flats where she was stabbed, she refuses to go in without back-up, waiting twenty minutes for the police. They find a man has been stabbed and he dies in Resus. Guest starring Matthew Gillespie, Isabella Mayes and Charlotte Mayes Tally Harper is introduced Note: Title Sequence (White, Green and Red) changed
| 362 | 2 | "Protection" | John Dower | Stepheen McAteer | 21 September 2002 | 8.34 |
Locum SHO Heather Lincoln starts work at the department. Her first patient is a man with a fish hook stuck in his throat. She arranges a date with Simon but then stands him up in favour of Dillon. Roxy is struggling with childcare issues and has to leave Nicole with Jack at the flat. A teenager gives birth at home with help from her boyfriend and brother, then dumps the baby at the hospital. She is later brought in with the placenta lodged in her abdomen but refuses to be admitted or have anything to go with the baby, forcing Mubbs Hussein to remove it in A&E. Afterwards, Simon passes her details on to the police and Social Services. McGuire reprimands Nikki for delaying helping the stabbing victim, then tells her to accept a bravery award for the PR. Comfort reveals Rob is divorcing her and naming Fin as co-respondent. An elderly woman, Kate, is brought in against her wishes; Charlie recognises her as Duffy's mother. It is discovery she is in end stage breast cancer and Duffy is annoyed Charlie tried to keep it from her. Lara's trial for unlawful killing begins. The pathology reports fail to confirm her account and Melanie insists David wasn't the one who raped her. Guest starring Jack Fortune, Radhika Aggarwal and Zienia Merton Heather Lincoln is introduced
| 363 | 3 | "Judgement Day" (Note: See also "Judgement Day" series 6) | Anthony Garner | Colin Wyatt | 28 September 2002 | 8.36 |
Dillon has spent the night with Heather but it comes to an abrupt end when he gets a call from Lara updating him on the court case. Harry and Duffy are due to give evidence, leaving Simon running the department, but Duffy's evidence is dismissed as hearsay and the prosecution force Harry to admit Lara lost a promotion because she was distracted by David. Urdu sisters Mariam and Samera are brought in after a car accident, accompanied by a shady man. It turns out they have both swallowed heroin bags and Mariam dies of an overdose after hers burst. Their handler is chased off by new security guard Ryan Johnson and Samera explains Mariam's husband died leaving them in debt and the smugglers are holding her children. Charlie calls the police over Dillon and Heather's objections but when Harry returns he hands the drugs over to the police but lets Samera go. Josh and Nikki treat a man having a heart attack in a cold store. Nikki convinces Josh to give him thrombolysis despite the danger. He has a reaction because of an enlarged prostate but survives. Kate is brought in after fitting and tells Charlie she doesn't want to be resuscitated. She dies in Resus and Ryan comforts Duffy. Dillon goes to court in time to hear Lara be found guilty. Guest starring Kiran Dadlani, Seema Bowri and Simon Bowen Ryan Johnson is introduced
| 364 | 4 | "Thicker Than Water" (Note: See also "Thicker Than Water" series 11 & "Blood Is Thicker Than Water" series 28) | Richard Holthouse | Leslie Stewart | 5 October 2002 | 8.55 |
A woman, Hanna, is brought in by her sister Sonia: She has a pulmonary embolism but has messed up her warfarin and ibuprofen, causing severe bleeding. Simon wants to give her a transfusion but she is a Jehovah's Witness. He waits until she is unconscious, then gives her the transfusion anyway. Sonia lies to Harry saying Simon didn't know but blames Simon for ruining her relationship with Hanna. McGuire insists Nikki attend the bravery award ceremony in uniform. She turns up wearing a stab vest she bought herself and makes comments to the journalists about the service failing to offer protection. Josh gets out of breath climbing the stairs at a multi storey car park and stumbles carrying a woman down the stairs at a block of flats, prompting Fin to call for back-up. He is unable to join Colette at salsa lessons so she invites Simon to accompany her. Heather refuses to believe Simon run a bet to get a date with a patient until she turns up at the department; even then, she only gives him a kiss on the cheek. Anna criticises Roxy for staying out all night and leaving her and Nikki to look after Nicole. A very young boy tells Jack and Ryan his mother is ill in the car park; she is diabetic and has gone hypo but Harry and Anna manage to revive her while Roxy looks after her son. Dillon accompanies Lara to her sentencing where she is given three years. Guest starring Jack Fortune, Georgina Freeman and Jaime Murray
| 365 | 5 | "What Little Girls are Made Of" | Gwennan Sage | Jo O'Keefe | 12 October 2002 | 8.98 |
Jack insists on accompanying Nikki and Comfort when they are called out to a gang fight. A girl, Shonagh, is being beaten by a rival gang, whose leader Kelly slept with the boyfriend of Shonagh's friend Chamelle. Chamelle turns up and points a gun at Jack when he tries to intervene. The ambulance leaves with Shonagh and hear a gunshot; Kelly is later brought into hospital and dies. Shonagh befriends Jodie, a girl brought in with stomach pains. She turns out to be pregnant but then develops a pulmonary embolism and dies in theatre. Shonagh, a single mother, refuses to go on the run with Chamelle and later hears she was arrested at the airport. A boy is brought in with what Heather dismisses as an asthma attack. Colette feels it is more serious and gets Harry for a second opinion. He discovers an epiglottis problem; Heather deflects blame by discovering he hadn't had his hepatitis jab. Roxy struggles with a crying Nicole on her day off and Jack helps her out. Lara discovers her cellmate has tried to commit suicide by hanging herself; she initially leaves it to the prison officers before stepping in and saving her. Dillon visits her in jail so Heather takes Simon back to hers instead. Guest starring Lisa Millett, Alan Stocks and Ashley Thewlis
| 366 | 6 | "What's Love Got To Do with It?" | Ian White | Peter Mills | 19 October 2002 | 8.48 |
A woman, Theresa, is in a car crash with her mentally disabled daughter Mary and a young girl, Amy. In hospital, Theresa dies and Amy is revealed to be Mary's daughter. Dillon and Colette try to get them admitted so Social Services can do a full assessment but Simon and Charlie refuse to go along with it and they are split up pending a review. Dillon gets into an argument with Simon which ends with them fighting over Heather. A man, Joe, is found beaten up. The man who found him tries to chat up both Comfort and Duffy. His girlfriend Sabine turns up and reveals her family were behind the attack; they are travellers and disapprove of the relationship. The couple try to leave but Joe is attacked again and dies in Resus. Sabine tries to commit suicide in front of her brother, who led the attack, by slitting her wrists. He takes her back to hospital where he is recognised and arrested. Duffy agrees to a date with Ryan. A man comes in with food poisoning after eating with an old girlfriend he met on Friends Reunited; Heather nearly starts a health investigation until his ex admits she spiked his food with droppings as revenge for dumping her in school. Harry asks Anna's help in buying lingerie for Beth. Roxy struggles with Nicole when Stella refuses to take her and she has to rely on creches. At the end of the shift, she abandons Nicole in the mother and baby section of a department store. Guest starring Siwan Morris, Robin King and Scott Bailey
| 367 | 7 | "The Ties That Bind" (Note: See also "The Ties That Bind" series 7, "The Ties That Bind" series 13, "The Ties That Bind" series 26 & "The Ties That Bind Us" series 19) | Sven Arnstein | Ann Marie Di Mambro | 26 October 2002 | 9.12 |
Roxy rings the Samaritans on waking and talks to Dillon, with them eventually realising who the other is. Roxy retrieves Nicole from the store, where she has been left undiscovered all night, and takes her to hospital where Harry finds she is dehydrated. Charlie and Harry discipline Simon and Dillon for their fight. Dillon lets slip to Charlie about Roxy's problems; he has no option but to put her on special leave and call Social Services. Ryan helps an old woman who falls down the steps in a shopping mall. She has had a stroke and Heather thinks her incomprehensible speech is dysphasia: In fact, she is talking Gaelic, having grown up on a small Scottish island. She recently came to live with her daughter after her husband died but wants to go back. When she suffers a second stroke, Duffy tells the daughter she wants to go home to die. Club owner Eddie Vincent brings in a bouncer who has been beaten and has internal injuries. He cancels his contract and bribes his wife to stay quiet. Tony recognises him as his and Jack's estranged father and is uncomfortable when Jack decides to get to know him. Lara reluctantly treats her cellmate, Amber, on the quiet after she receives a beating. Duffy visits her with a birthday card and afterwards kisses Ryan. Guest starring Gary Calandro, Sarah Paul and Dolina MacLennan
| 368 | 8 | "It's a Boy Thing" | Jeremy Webb | Andrew Holden | 2 November 2002 | 9.19 |
Two drivers, Robert and Alan, confront each other in a road rage incident. Alan collapses from a heart attack and, when the ambulance turns up, Robert attacks Josh before driving off. A teenager, Matt, is brought into hospital and claims he took an overdose. Colette learns he is lying and that he is Robert's son, who thinks Robert cares more about his lady friends than him. Alan smashes up Robert's car but collapses again; his wife tells him that, since he has to stay in hospital, she will go on the holiday she has booked with someone else. Robert is arrested but Josh downplays things for Matt's sake, before admitting to Fin he thinks something is wrong with him. A man comes in who thinks he has been made ill by lack of sex. Anna realises his wife fed him HRT tablets to slow him down and convinces him and Harry to keep quiet about it. Duffy talks to Roxy, who explains she can't afford child care. Jack visits Eddie at the club he owns. Harry takes Anna to feed a friend's dog; he kisses her but she puts a stop to things. Melanie comes in with chest pains and turns out to be addicted to pain medication. Duffy learns she came in with injuries under assumed names and that her daughter Lisa was injured when caught in the crossfire of an argument. She convinces Melanie you can't stay loyal to a dead husband and she needs to help Lara. Guest starring Colin Mace, Geoffrey Bateman and Bernard Kay
| 369 | 9 | "Innocence" | Jim O'Hanlon | Gregory Evans | 9 November 2002 | 9.42 |
Nikki rushes in a scaled baby and Roxy, returned from suspension, helps calm him down while Harry and Dillon treat him. A former nurse turned lecturer, Mark, finds one of his students, Molly, collapsed in the bath and suspects an overdose. Roxy is delighted to see Mark: He is Nicole's father, her former lecturer who she broke up with to avoid wrecking his marriage. Molly was also having an affair with him but learned he was seeing another student. She did not take an overdose but has carbon monoxide poisoning from a faulty heater. Roxy tells Mark Molly has told his wife and to expect a letter from the Child Support Agency. A teenage boy is pressured by his older brother into mugging an old lady and is then hit by a car. They both end up in hospital where the boy explains their mother doesn't care about them. The old lady claims he merely helped her up when she fell and he agrees to keep visiting her. She turns out to have terminal cancer. Josh has tests done and tells Colette he is suffering from the male menopause and needs testosterone replacement therapy. Eddie gives Jack tickets to his club and Jack is disappointed when a glamour photo of Nikki turns up in a magazine. Lara is released after Melanie tells the appeal court that David raped and abused her and could have killed Lara. Jan tells Charlie and Harry that she doesn't want Lara back but Harry pre-empts her by telling the press that Lara is returning to work. Guest starring Stefan Dennis, Rachel Leskovac and Gudrun Ure
| 370 | 10 | "Return of the Native" | A.J. Quinn | Julie Dixon | 16 November 2002 | 8.71 |
Lara is asked to leave by her landlady and runs over a dog on her way back to her first day; Harry helps her save him. She is informed she will be restricted to minor injuries and barred from rape and domestic violence cases for a trial period, and a mother refuses to let her treat her son. She is also bothered by a reporter. A woman comes in with stomach pains and tells Simon she is going to a fertility clinic. He agrees to rush her through but her boyfriend gets Lara to discharge her. She collapses at an airport and Simon realises fertility drugs have caused an ectopic pregnancy: They were planning to sell her eggs in the United States, which is illegal in the UK. An old lady comes in confused with minor injuries, claiming her name is Agatha Christie. Her son is eventually tracked down and explains she fled a nursing home. Heather leaves her alone to look after a handsome patient and she ends up on the roof; Roxy talks her down. A man is involved in a car crash and Heather writes him up antibiotics that his notes say he had before but he suffers an allergic reaction; he had stolen the car and was impersonating the owner, with Heather failing to pick up on inconsistencies in the notes. Heather spends most of her last shift napping in the on call room so Simon and Dillon leave her tied up in there. She is found by Harry who tells her she won't get a good reference. Roxy sees Duffy and Ryan kissing and spreads it around the department; Charlie is the last to know when he sees them leaving together. Colette tells Simon she is replacing him with Josh as her dance partner. Jack takes Nikki to Eddie's club where photographer Jay chats her up and kisses her. Jack follows him outside and hits him, causing him to hit his head; Jack runs away when people approach. Guest starring Tehmina Sacranie, Matyelok Gibbs and Matthew Devitt Heather Lincoln departs
| 371 | 11 | "Up to Your Neck in It" | Nic Phillips | Edel Brosnan | 23 November 2002 | 8.59 |
Simon and Duffy are both unhappy about Lara having to be supervised but Harry tells them the order came from higher up and there's nothing he can do. A man, Carl, steals the car containing his son Owen, who has been forbidden from seeing, running over Owen's grandfather Jim's leg in the process. Carl leaves Owen alone in the car and it rolls into the river; Josh and Colette are nearby and Josh saves him. Both Jim and his daughter Sarah are unhappy with Carl but Josh convince them to let him see Owen. Josh tells Colette he wants a family but she isn't interested. Lara and Anna treat a middle-aged man who left his wife to go travelling in Asia. They find he has syphilis but he insists he didn't sleep with anyone on his travels. His wife turns up and reveals she had an affair before he went away and passed it on to him. Jack is arrested for the assault on Jay and confesses but Eddie threatens Jay into dropping the complaint. Jay tells Nikki what happened and advises her to stay away from both of them. Guest starring Gareth Thomas, Julie Corbett and Jason Hughes
| 372 | 12 | "Gimme Shelter" | Euros Lyn | Robert Scott-Fraser | 30 November 2002 | 8.49 |
Nikki is shocked to be partnered with Emma, a trainee technician. They are called out to the theatre where the lighting rig fell on an actor during a performance. Nikki tries to call for assistance but St. James' has a major incident so Harry and Simon are permanently manning Resus and Lara is on her own in cubicles. Nikki ends up putting a line in herself despite not being qualified and Josh covers for her. Nikki breaks up with Jack over the attack on Jay, while Tony also falls out with him after learning what happened from Roxy. A man turns up with amnesia and knife wounds to his hands. The police identify him by his bank card and he recalls that his wife was killed by an intruder in the home and his daughter is away. Nikki and Emma go to the house to find the wife's body and the daughter hiding under a bed, saying her father did it. The man takes Lara hostage but Tony distracts him until Ryan overpowers him; the daughter will be taken into care. Josh confides in Charlie about his andopause and his problems with Colette. Lara treats a man with a scalded arm and overhears him threatening to hurt his wife when they get home for spilling coffee on him. Harry orders her to discharge them. The wife is later brought in with a head injury but still refuses to leave her husband. Lara threatens to quit and Harry takes her to stay with his family. Guest starring Richard Lumsden, Seeta Indrani and Joseph Bennett
| 373 | 13 | "Blame" | Sven Arnstein | Stuart Blackburn | 7 December 2002 | 8.32 |
A driver has a stroke at the wheel and swerves into pedestrians, including a mother and her two sons. Josh bonds with the younger boy, whose mother and older brother are badly injured. They both die at the hospital and Josh comforts their father who keeps it from his surviving son, only for the boy to also die from a head injury. Lara has an uncomfortable reunion with Paula Newcombe when she comes in as a patient. Although Harry tells her to stay away from the case, when Anna asks her to look at the scan, Lara realises Paula is in the early stages of TB and the two women clear the air. Fin reveals he has a new girlfriend, Juliet, and Comfort suggests they go on a double date. Tony finds Jack working at Eddie's club and softens slightly towards his father after hearing his side of the marriage break-up. With Josh busy, Colette accompanies Simon to a charity dinner. Harry takes Lara when Beth has to work late and the two men get into a bidding war over a necklace, which Simon buys for Colette. Beth is unhappy that Harry lent Lara one of her dresses without asking and Simon and Colette's plan to go on somewhere is thwarted when Josh arrives to pick her up. Guest starring Joe McGann, Clifford Barry and Corrina Preece
| 374 | 14 | "Feuds and Fury" | Lawrence Gordon Clark | Julian Spilsbury | 14 December 2002 | 9.28 |
A man, Terry, has been caught chopping down a Christmas tree without permission and is chased by the owner, Brian, who falls and injures himself. Terry is brought into hospital by his wife having severed his thumb, which cannot be reattached. It transpires that Brian is his wife's brother and they have been feuding since Brian was left the farm and his sister some money. Charlie helps reconcile the family. Roxy is moonlighting at a minicab firm while Dillon babysits, but the job quickly ends when she hits her boss after he makes a pass at her. Colette lies to Josh about where she got the necklace from. Fin pulls out of the double date; Comfort breaks up with her boyfriend and goes back to him. Harry tells Lara she can stay as long as she wants but, while she gets on well with Tally and Kizzy whilst babysitting, Anna and Beth are both suspicious of Harry's interest in her. Jack points out a drug dealer to Eddie at the club so Eddie and a bouncer beat him up and dump him outside. He is later run over while lying injured. Jack makes a feeble but successful attempt to threaten him into keeping quiet; he claims he was staggering around drunk and the driver is charged with drink driving. Tony's low opinion of Eddie is reinforced but Eddie tells Jack he's proud of him. Guest starring Andrew McCulloch, Ian Brimble and Alwyne Taylor
| 375 | 15 | "Some Comfort, No Joy, and a Bit Too Much Love" | Jim O'Hanlon | David Joss Buckley | 21 December 2002 | 9.10 |
Fin and Comfort spend the shift coming across elements of the Christmas story: A man who fell off his roof hanging an angel there, a shepherd who injured his leg and a young woman giving birth surrounded by virgin oil in a restaurant run by three wise men. Having initially opted to go to her family, Comfort agrees to spend Christmas with Fin. A woman is brought in after having a heart attack and dies in Resus. Her husband, Michael, seems very anxious and Harry orders a psychiatric assessment: He has monophobia, a fear of being alone. Most of the staff go to a Christmas party with a school fancy dress theme, leaving Charlie and Duffy in charge of a skeleton shift. Duffy asks Ryan to move in with her. Josh misses the party, despite it being his and Colette's first anniversary, to play Father Christmas at a fire service charity do, where he helps a boy who chokes on a balloon. At the party, Nikki agrees to give Jack another chance, Beth catches Harry comforting Lara, Anna discovers her date who she met through a dating service is married and being followed by a private detective, and Simon and Colette have sex in an alley. Josh accepts a lift to the party from Michael but finds he is suicidal and has his wife's body in the back seat. He crashes the car into the outside of the hospital; most of the party goers emerge in time to see Josh get out of the car just before it explodes. Guest starring Des McAleer, Seeta Indrani and Dominic Power Last episode to feature the original exterior hospital set on College Road since 1986.
| 376 | 16 | "Living for the Moment" | Chris Lovett | Robert Scott-Fraser | 28 December 2002 | 9.14 |
Roxy and Dillon treat one of the workmen repairing the damage to the hospital when he puts a nail through his hand. A young man comes in with a head injury and Roxy agrees to rush him through the CT scan as he is meant to be going on holiday with his friends. However, Harry and Simon discover he has an inoperable brain tumour. Harry and the neurologist want to admit him but Roxy forces them to tell him he has less than a year to live. He leaves with his friends, intending to enjoy his remaining time. Lara is moving out of Harry's, while Jack moves in with Eddie. A woman with Parkinson's disease is found collapsed in her garden and tests show she doesn't have pneumonia. Her husband, a police inspector, admits to Lara and Tony that he stole ecstasy from evidence and used it to alleviate her symptoms. Harry keeps quiet on condition he destroys the remaining tablets. A car has crashed into a tree, injuring the unrestrained front seat passenger. PC McCormack tries to breathalyse his wife but she claims she has breathing problems so Nikki and Comfort have to take her in as well. When she fails a test at the hospital, the couple's teenage daughter admits she drove despite being underage, since her parents were both drunk. All three are arrested. Roxy has taken a part-time job in a bar but has an uncomfortable first shift when a customer tries it on with her. Simon tells Colette their liaison was a mistake and goes to a club where a woman, Jane, gives him her number. Colette tells Comfort she thinks her marriage is over. Guest starring Andrew Bicknell, Fiona Welburn and Seb Castang
| 377 | 17 | "Friend or Foe" | Nic Phillips | Rod Lewis | 4 January 2003 | 9.54 |
A teenager breaks into his neighbours' shed and finds a Robot Wars-style robot. He plays with it without permission, knocking over some chemicals. When the man goes back to the shed and turns the power on, it explodes. Both man and boy end up in hospital; the boy has chemical burns but the man and his wife refuse to say what chemicals were involved until Harry realises he took them from his workplace. An elderly man whose wife died recently is found collapsed. He has a blood clot and, thinking he was dying, tells Simon that when he was in Korea he and a friend hid for days while his friend slowly died of his wounds, begging for death. As a result, when his wife, who had rheumatic arthritis, asked him to kill her, he did. He recovers and Simon says there's not enough evidence to report him, knowing he's been having nightmares ever since. Donna, a paediatric nurse on attached from St. James', helps Lara and Roxy look after a baby, who keeps showing conflicting symptoms. Donna suggests the mother has Munchausen's by proxy and Lara tells Roxy to watch the baby from the suture room but Duffy sends her away. Duffy later sees Donna suffocating the baby: It was her all along. Donna is arrested. Duffy wants to set up a business selling baby things on the internet with Ryan and he asks her to marry him. Anna goes on another blind date: He doesn't turn up but she gets chatting to Merlin Jameson, a man she meets in the bar. Jack comes home to find Eddie has been beaten up; he admits he owes money and is planning to hijack a deal to raise cash. Josh arranges a special dinner and a holiday in Cuba for Colette but she tells him she's leaving him. Guest starring Peter Vaughan, Suzette Llwellyn and Joe Figg Merlin Jameson is introduced First episode since 1986 to feature new exterior hospital set located on Lawrence Hill Trading Estate, Bristol.
| 378 | 18 | "Collision Course" | Ian White | Peter Mills | 11 January 2003 | 9.88 |
Colette moves out of Josh's to stay with Comfort and confides in her about her liaison with Simon. Josh gets treated to a succession of frustrating call-outs, including a woman with a head injury who refuses to go into hospital because she's waiting for a delivery and an elderly woman whose dog is ill. Jane has gone on a date with Simon and tries to get Harry and Dillon to give her a sick note but they refuse. Fin and Nikki later bring in Jimmy, a boy left at home alone who has had a severe asthma attack. It turns out he is Jane's son: The babysitter didn't turn up and she couldn't afford to take a day off work. Roxy tells Dillon she has been working nights. Anna learns Merlin has joined the department on attachment as a pre-registration house officer. They work together to get rid of time-wasters, like a man faking blindness. A boy, Colin, comes in with suspected food poisoning but turns out to have appendicitis and no theatre is available. Lara is left looking after him alone as his appendix ruptures when Reeve-Jones calls Harry and Simon to help with a private patient: A teenage girl who has developed an infection from a breast enlargement. Harry criticises the girls' parents for giving her the operation before her body had fully developed, as an attempt to fix image issues, despite being refused an NHS referral. However, he himself faces criticism from Jane and from Colin's father. Jack acts as the getaway driver for Eddie's heist and helps him fight off a security guard but crashes into a parked lorry. Eddie and the others flee with the loot, leaving Jack unconscious. Guest starring Naomi Taylor, Ben Fox and Sally Mates
| 379 | 19 | "Sins of the Father" | Jim O'Hanlon | Jo O'Keefe | 18 January 2003 | 9.54 |
Jason, the man that Jack beat up during the heist, is rushed into hospital in a bad way. Jack is found unconscious with a dislocated shoulder and it is assumed he was run over by the getaway car. Jane turns up at the hospital with a friend, Liz, who is eager to leave but eventually admits to Simon she has Crohn's Disease. Jane tries to tell Simon something but he is only interested in the fact she's single and kisses her. Two brothers, Tom and mentally disabled Kenny, have run away together but end up in hospital when Tom has a seizure. Their father's girlfriend attacks Kenny without provocation and hits Dillon when he intervenes. It turns out she is beating the boys, who are reunited with their father while she is left facing assault charges. Roxy and Dillon briefly kiss but are interrupted by Anna and Merlin. Tony is suspicious when Eddie joins him and his gran Beryl at the hospital. Eddie tells Jack that if he lets anything slip to the police he'll be left to carry the can. Guest starring Nina Young, Charlie Miller and Jonathan Stephens
| 380 | 20 | "Spiteful God" | Lawrence Gordon Clark | Leslie Stewart | 25 January 2003 | 9.45 |
Charlie returns from holiday to learn that Josh's marriage has broken up and Duffy is resigning. Lara and Anna treat a man who has suffered a heart attack; he knows his wife has cheated on him but is worried that if he says anything she will leave him. His wife tries to confess but he dies. A girl has a fall climbing into a power station for a dare. Fin and Nikki go in to treat her, where interference means they're out of radio contact. While they're there, Josh and Comfort pick up Fin's daughter Emma who has fallen ill at school. Fin eventually joins her mother Liza; she is found to have septicaemia and placed in intensive care. Roxy and Dillon kiss again and leave the department together. Jack is keeping an eye on Jason, whose condition is improving. Tony finds Eddie about to skip town and refuses money Eddie tries to leave for him and Jack. Jason recalls seeing Jack when they are alone but then deteriorates again. Guest starring Katie McEwen, Ian Pirie and Bethan Mansfield
| 381 | 21 | "Flight" | Jim O'Hanlon | Len Collin | 1 February 2003 | 9.45 |
It is Duffy's last shift and both Colette and Dillon are hoping to take over her position. A baby is brought in with irritated skin; Simon and Charlie suspect the mother placed him in too hot water and the father agrees but the paediatrician discovers he has staphylococcal scalded skin syndrome. The mother is angry that the father didn't trust her. Fin continues to keep a vigil over Emma, who is responding but may have organ failure. Tony arranges a date with Ben Saunders. Harry and Beth are sailing when they come across a stranded boat full of Kosovan refugees; the crew abandoned them to die. The group's self-appointed leader, Sali, has been rationing supplies. Harry releases Florian, a man locked in the hold, who promptly stabs Sali. He was allegedly locked up for stealing food but reveals he actually recognised Sali as a member of the Kosovo Liberation Army who killed a number of alleged Serb collaborators, including the husband of a woman on the boat. Florian dies of angina and Harry regrets making a snap judgement about the two men. Simon goes to see Jane but she is busy and tells him she's an escort. DI Langer tells Jack that Jason revealed his attacker visited him and they want him to do an identity parade. Eddie tells him the people they stole the money from are also after them. Jack and Eddie skip town after a brief farewell with Nikki. Guest starring Goran Kostic, Julian Rivett and Daniella Dessa
| 382 | 22 | "Love Hurts" | Declan O'Dwyer | Edel Brosnan | 8 February 2003 | 9.77 |
Colette and Dillon both go for promotion and Colette is made ward sister. A young girl is brought in by her parents and shows signs of malnutrition; it turns out her parents are committed vegans and have been giving her the same food they eat with no dairy substitutes. Colette calls social services against Dillon's wishes and Charlie backs her up; Dillon and Roxy convince the parents to co-operate with them. Charlie hires Bex Reynolds as a replacement for Jack while DS Langer investigates his disappearance. Fin tells Comfort that Emma is recovering but is reluctant to let them meet. A woman is annoyed that her boyfriend refuses to commit to her after his wife left him, while the man's daughter is worried she will hurt him as well. She tells the daughter she is moving in, then collapses after appearing dizzy. She is found to have heart problems; the boyfriend is on beta blockers and worries she took them in a suicide attempt. After a chat with Bex, the daughter admits she put them in her coffee and is sent to live with her mother. Simon tells Jane he wants to try and get past her work. Duffy tells Charlie Ryan has disappeared with her car and the key to the office and reports him missing to the police. The car is found at the train station and Duffy learns he has emptied their joint account. Guest starring Rhiannon Parry, Amelia Curtis and David Walliams Bex Reynolds is introduced
| 383 | 23 | "Hitting Home – Part One" | Gwennan Sage | Ann Marie Di Mambro | 15 February 2003 | 9.33 |
A priest, Gerry, is leading a protest demonstration outside an abortion clinic. While he is arguing with a woman in the road, a cyclist tries to get past and crashes into a stationary vehicle; he suffers head injuries and dies in hospital. The woman is taken in with minor injuries and asks Colette not to tell her husband she is pregnant; however, Roxy isn't kept in the loop and lets it slip. She tells her husband she doesn't think they're responsible enough to be parents but tells Colette that if she has the abortion now her marriage will be over. Lara finds Colette's coil has been misaligned and Colette later learns she is pregnant. She tries to talk to Simon but finds him with Jane. Tony asks Ben to move in with him. Anna's mother Lyn turns up for treatment of sores and Anna hides Merlin from her. Merlin tells Anna he is adopted. Duffy tells her children and Charlie that Ryan has taken her savings and she will have to sell the house and sign on with an agency to make ends meet. A newlywed, Jenny, arrives home to find her mother-in-law Sheila badly beaten and the house trashed. However, her husband Ian covers up the matter with the police, knowing his father Bill was responsible, and Sheila tells hospital staff she fell down the stairs. Gerry admits to Comfort that he sent Sheila back to Bill when he first hit her, but the beatings continued and he now thinks she should leave him but she no longer listens to him. Comfort tries to warn Jenny but Ian drags her away. Guest starring Bruce Alexander, Jeremy Turner-Welch and Deborah Grant
| 384 | 24 | "Hitting Home – Part Two" | Tania Diez | Ann Marie Di Mambro | 22 February 2003 | 9.66 |
Duffy returns to the department as an agency nurse with Charlie keen to have her back full-time. She disobeys Colette's instructions to discharge a homeless boy from an abusive home as quickly as possible, instead getting Lara to admit him, and Charlie backs her up. Comfort notices Colette's short fuse and she admits that she is pregnant and hasn't told Josh, who is away. Charlie and Harry deal with an inspector, Hilary. Jane calls Simon to help with Alistair, a client who has had a heart attack, but he needs to go to hospital. There, it transpires he is Hilary's husband. The staff save his life and Hilary tells them they've passed. Simon tells Jane he loves her but can't share her. Fin and Comfort find Jenny has been badly beaten by Ian, who has minor injuries. At the hospital, Comfort confronts Ian and Bill with photos of Jenny's injuries, prompting Bill to attack her and be thrown out. Sheila initially encourages Jenny to put up with the abuse but eventually realises her own acceptance has caused Ian to turn out like his father; she calls the police and Ian is arrested, with Bill also facing charges for assaulting Comfort. Sheila gives Jenny a photo of her injuries and tells her to never go back to Ian. Guest starring Jeremy Turner-Welch, Deborah Grant and Alyson Spiro
| 385 | 25 | "Dire Straits" | Dominic Santana | Gregory Evans | 1 March 2003 | 10.00 |
George, an elderly man with Alzheimer's, goes to the house where he used to live as a child. His daughter Hope comes to collect him but their car ends up crashing into a wall and George suffers a head injury. Harry recognises George, his superior when he was a houseman, and gets Hope to call her sister Clemmie; Harry was once engaged to Clemmie but broke it off because he was in love with Hope, who rejected him. Hope admits that, after years of caring for George, she did nothing when he grabbed the wheel. George dies. Harry welcomes neurological consultant Selina Donovan who will be doing drug trials at the hospital, which Charlie objects to. Colette admits to Comfort that Simon is the baby's father but Simon tells her to have an abortion. Jane is brought in after fainting in the street. She asks Lara and Colette to hide her from Simon but he sees her. Colette overhears them talking and spreads the fact she is a prostitute around the department. Upset by the gossip, Jane tries to leave but is won over when Simon publicly defends their relationship. Nikki is horrified to be paired with McGuire for the shift. They help a Kurdish man and his daughter after the man spills burning oil over his foot but McGuire is suspicious of the pair and the man ends up taking them hostage: They are asylum seekers who left their designated area when a fellow Kurd was murdered. Nikki tries to gain their trust but McGuire alerts the police and during an escape attempt the daughter falls from a balcony. While Nikki treats her, McGuire goes to get equipment from the ambulance and suffers a heart attack. Guest starring Kevork Malikyan, Desire Densiti and Karen Ascoe Selina Donovan is introduced
| 386 | 26 | "Fool for Love" | Jeremy Webb | Ginnie Hole | 8 March 2003 | 9.72 |
Merlin sees a man throw himself into an empty swimming pool. He and Comfort find a bag of money and a suicide note in the flat where the man's girlfriend lives. Tests show he has taken an overdose as well but he refuses treatment so Merlin goes to find his girlfriend. However, when they arrive they find the man's wife has turned up and seems fully aware of the situation: He embezzled millions of pounds from his employers, resulting in two friends being made redundant. He agrees to treatment and asks Duffy to phone the police. Josh is now in charge of the station following McGuire's death. Fin notices Colette's short temper and Comfort tells him of her pregnancy. A retiring doctor goes out for dinner with two friends and suffers a heart attack. When Fin and Comfort arrive, the other two insist on doing the resuscitation themselves despite being drunk and unfamiliar with the equipment. Josh has to order them all to hospital where the man is declared dead. Josh supports his staff, as does one of the two doctors, but Fin is sent home when he keeps losing his temper. Selina believes a man who has had a stroke is ideal for the drug trial but his boyfriend is worried of the risks. Selina goes to the man's son, sparking off an argument, but eventually they agree to the trial and the patient recovers. Tony and Ben go for a drink to celebrate moving in together but Ben's old boyfriend John turns up and reveals they recently slept together. In a fight, Ben accidentally knocks Tony off a dock, causing him to hit his head, and he is rushed into surgery. Guest starring Richard Standing, Jeremy Child and Souad Faress
| 387 | 27 | "Keep It in the Family" (Note: See also "Keeping It in the Family" series 9) | Nic Phillips | Danny McCahon | 15 March 2003 | 9.12 |
Another stroke patient is given the drug trial; her daughter has approved but her son objects when he turns up. It becomes clear he is worried she will survive but need looking after so the daughter says she will do it if so. A young woman comes in with chest pains and Merlin is shocked when she dies from an undiagnosed hereditary heart condition: She was adopted and never looked for her birth parents so was unaware of their medical history. Tony is on a ward with kidney damage, needing permanent dialysis unless he gets a transplant. Anna points out to Nikki that Jack could be a match. Colette tells Simon she is going to keep the baby and tell Josh he is the father. Simon goes out for lunch with Jane but takes her to hospital when she shows co-ordination problems. The neurosurgeon finds she has a brain tumour which seems to be inoperable. Harry cancels a driving lesson with Tally to go for dinner with Selina so she asks Beth to take her instead. Beth is distracted and they end up crashing into a tree with Beth unrestrained. When Harry doesn't answer his phone, Lara ends Merlin to get him just as Selina was inviting him back to hers. Beth dies of a head injury in Resus and Harry walks away from Tally. Guest starring Alison Lintott, Hugh Sachs and Carolyn Bazely
| 388 | 28 | "A Hard Day's Night" | Richard Holthouse | Robert Scott-Fraser | 22 March 2003 | 9.06 |
Nikki and Comfort are called out to an estate where a black youth with a white girlfriend has been attacked by white thugs. A group of black youths later beat up the girl's brother despite him insisting he played no part in the attack. The couple are encouraged to go away together for safety. When the girl's father turns up at the hospital, it becomes clear he arranged the attack and he is arrested. Harry is fighting with his family but wants to return to work, while Selina is getting the cold shoulder from the department. Simon is neglecting his work to observe Jane and arranges to observe her operation. A GP brings in his son who he suspects has malaria; in fact, he has been diagnosed with SVT but keeps this from his father. His father gives him beta blockers when he falls ill, causing a distracted Simon to think nothing is wrong, and he needs emergency treatment in Resus. Selina presenting herself as a consultant, together with the boy helping him realise he is overcompensating for not noticing his wife's cancer, manage to calm the father down. Simon gets emotional when part of Jane's brain has to be tied off and has to admit to the surgeon that she is his girlfriend. Colette tells Josh of her pregnancy but refuses to get back with him. Jack visits Tony and offers to donate a kidney; Nikki lets him stay on her floor. Dillon takes staff to surprise Roxy at the restaurant where she works, where she is required to dress up as a schoolgirl and cane customers. When she refuses to serve Dillon, she is fired and breaks up with him. Guest starring Jasper Jacobs, Katie Foster-Barnes and Andrew Knott
| 389 | 29 | "Side Effects" | Gwennan Sage | Stephen McAteer | 29 March 2003 | 9.32 |
A patient who has had a stroke is referred to Selina's trial, but when he starts bleeding, Harry, who has just returned to work, blames Selina for not taking a proper medical history. It turns out the patient actually has bowel cancer. Simon visits Jane, who has been left partially paralysed by the operation, and convinces her not to break up with him. Josh tells Colette she can have a divorce but he won't abandon the baby; instead, she asks to move back in. Charlie is unimpressed with the flats Duffy is viewing and suggests she move in with him for the same rent. Merlin tells Anna he has written to his birth mother and is planning to meet her. Jack goes to see Tony but learns his cancer treatment means he cannot be a donor so plans to return to Ireland. Bex, now permanent receptionist, recognises him and calls the police, who he hides from. A woman, Lorna, is found after being beaten by carjackets; it isn't discovered that her baby son Peter was in the car until her husband Tom is contacted. One of the carjackers, Ade, abandons the car with Peter inside and is stabbed when he stops his friend Billy calling the police. A mentally disabled man, Gilbert, who they hit with the car, tries to tell people about the baby; when Tom realises he is reciting his car number, Gilbert manages to take Josh and Comfort to Peter. Lorna dies in Resus. Ade comes in for treatment and Tom realises he is wearing a cap taken from the car. Harry pursues Ade but is attacked by him. Jack comes to his rescue and both he and Ade are arrested. Guest starring Andrew Clover, Michael Burns and Paul Ireland
| 390 | 30 | "An Act of God" | Euros Lyn | Jason Sutton | 5 April 2003 | 9.01 |
A teenage girl goes into labour in a church; she is a member of a strict patriarchal Christian group that Roxy's aunt once belonged to. Her mother wants them to raise the baby, even if it means leaving the community. However, the girl thinks it isn't want her late father would want and runs off, leaving the baby behind. Jack is released without charge when the witness fails to pick him out of a line-up and contacts Eddie about being a donor for Tony. Merlin arranges to meet his birth mother but it turns out to be Lyn, who leaves without him seeing her when she realises. Tally sees Selina kissing Harry goodbye and arranges to stay with Lara. The hospital suffers a power cut caused by a lightning strike. Simon tells the electrician to wire a generator in directly but when he tries he is electrocuted and dies in Resus. A diver hit his head on the board as a result of the blackout; he turns out to have an intercranial bleed and Harry has to drill burr holes in the dark, saving him. At the end of the shift, Duffy is confronted by Ryan, who admits he always planned to con her but now wants her back. Guest starring Helen Murton, Aaron Neil and Charlie Morley Selina Donovan departs
| 391 | 31 | "The Point of No Return" | Declan O'Dwyer | David Joss Buckley | 12 April 2003 | 8.64 |
Ryan tells Duffy he has returned all the money he stole and bought a country club in New Zealand for them to run together. He also convinces Charlie he can make Duffy happy. Duffy leaves with Ryan after a farewell kiss with Charlie. An office worker hangs herself after coming in early and is rushed to hospital where the team fail to revive her. Her boss tries to get a co-worker to hide the suicide note but she gives it to Roxy for the coroner and tells the woman's husband she blamed it on her boss' bullying behaviour. He attacks the boss, whose cigar ignites a pool of petrol, engulfing him in a fireball. He is taken to hospital but is unlikely to live more than a few days. Eddie is tested and is a match for Tony but Tony is reluctant to accept help from him. Merlin went partying the previous night with two brothers, Tim and James, but Lizzie, a young woman at the party, has been raped. James is revealed as the culprit, angry that Lizzie turned him down some weeks ago. Merlin learns his birth mother wants to meet him but decides not to go. Anna goes in his place and is shocked to discover it is Lyn. Guest starring Les Dennis, Gary McDonald and Nia Roberts Lisa Duffin and Ryan Johnson depart
| 392 | 32 | "Stuck in the Middle with You" | Tim Holloway | Robert Scott-Fraser | 19 April 2003 | 9.30 |
Harry criticises Merlin for running tests on a patient and discharges the man only for him to immediately collapse because of undiagnosed anaemia; Harry had read the wrong patient's results. Lara accompanies Nikki and new paramedic Luke Warren, a former professional footballer with Holby United, on a shift. They are called out to a house fire where a woman has been badly burned. After she and her husband have gone to hospital, Luke finds their teenage daughter locked in the cellar, having refused an arranged marriage, and ends up trapped in there with her. Luke has to do an emergency procedure on a collapsed lung before the fire crew get them out. He has a go at her father, unaware his wife had died. Harry has a go at him and also at Simon for letting the husband see his wife's body, prompting Lara to question his fitness for work. It is revealed that Bex and Luke know each other. Colette tells Charlie about her pregnancy. Lyn tells Anna to break up with Merlin or she'll tell him the truth. Jack is back at the hospital worked as a janitor. Tony agrees to the kidney donation and Jack and Nikki wait for news as he and Eddie go into theatre. Guest starring Natalia Keery-Fisher, Kaleem Janjua and Kai Owen Luke Warren is introduced
| 393 | 33 | "Getting Through" | Deborah Paige | Catherine Tregenna | 26 April 2003 | 9.22 |
A college student is brought in after falling off her bike. She thinks her lab partner is going to leave his girlfriend for her but discovers that she has misunderstood the situation and he only sees her as a friend. A young girl, Tia, who has suffered an asthma attack, ends up in Resus. The young woman with her, Kelly, is her mother but since she had her when young, Kelly's mother Leila has raised Tia as her own. Leila has refused to let Tia take her medication because of claims it stunts growth. Harry puts her straight and she agrees to compromise with Kelly on raising Tia. Tony is recovering from the transplant but Eddie has contracted septicaemia and is rushed into Intensive Care. Anna tells Merlin she is his half-sister and he walks away, unable to cope with it. An aggressive teenager tries to get his father, who has abdominal pains, preferential treatment. Lara lets them through to cubicles where Anna sees the son has a gun. The police are called and the hospital evacuated, with Lara remaining with the pair to stop them getting suspicious. Tally, who has been waiting for Harry in his office, is held at gunpoint by the police but Harry comes to her rescue, ending the tension between them. The father has just spent eight years in jail for an armed robbery that left a security guard crippled but he regrets the incident, caused by an inexperienced member of his gang, and is disgusted to learn his son has been hanging out with his old gang and arranging a robbery to welcome him home. His illusions shattered and learning that he has stopped his father getting urgent treatment for a perforated ulcer, the son ignores Lara's attempts to get him to surrender and shoots himself in the head. The father arrests and Lara is unable to revive him. Guest starring Brian Abbott, Daniel Newman and Susan Penhaligon
| 394 | 34 | "Hurt the One You Love" | Andy Goddard | Steve Griffiths | 3 May 2003 | 8.69 |
During cycling training, two teenage boys, Karl and Ricki, get into a scuffle and rolls down an embankment, leaving Karl with a fractured wrist and Ricki with a broken leg. At the hospital, Karl's girlfriend Leanne reveals she told Ricki she was pregnant. Karl and Ricki have been seeing each other in secret and Ricki thought Karl was going to break up with Leanne. Karl tells his father and Leanne that he will be a father to the baby but is gay; they accept it. Jane is unhappy with letting Simon help her and ends the relationship. Colette goes to an antenatal scan and learns the baby has a clubbed foot and other deformities; she is reluctant to tell Josh. A businesswoman comes in with her younger boyfriend after developing a sore throat during a business lunch. She admits to the staff that she drinks excessively and is unaware her boyfriend slept with her teenage daughter. She starts coughing up blood; the drinking has damaged the veins in her throat and caused liver damage and she dies in Resus. Her boyfriend breaks a promise to look after her daughter, only offering her a bed for the night and to contact Social Services, but she says she has been looking after herself for years anyway. Jack is told Eddie is only being kept alive by a ventilator; the doctors withdraw treatment and Jack sits with him as he dies. Merlin tries to avoid working with Anna but after the shift he begs her to continue their relationship, despite it being incest, then accuses Lyn of ruining his life. Guest starring Stephen Wight, Matthew Noble and Gabrielle Glaister
| 395 | 35 | "An Accident Waiting To Happen" | Gwennan Sage | Paul Cornell | 10 May 2003 | 7.90 |
Merlin has resigned and refuses to give Harry a reason. Anna tells Nikki Merlin is her brother. Simon nearly refuses to treat Derek Moberley, a man who has been in a fight. Colette learns her baby has chromosomal problems and tries to tell Simon he needs to get tested but he won't acknowledge the baby could be his. Luke brings in Arnold Keeler, a retired footballer who had a fall at a nursing home and has broken his lip. Lara tries her best to get him surgery but his age and medical history means no anaesthetist will touch him. He is admitted to a ward and may never leave. The staff learn Luke and Bex used to be married. A teenager, Matt, is performing at a Battle of the Bands event; his girlfriend Emma is there with her younger sister Sally. Both Sally and Matt get crushed by the crowd and at hospital suffer reactions to ecstasy. It turns out Sally is supplying it and Emma insists she tell their parents. Jack, Tony and Nikki attend Eddie's funeral. The only other attendees are a group of shady characters led by Vinnay, and Jack is frustrated when Tony tells him they are Eddie's sons. Merlin again tries to get Anna to continue seeing him and Nikki comes home to find them about to sleep together. After overhearing the two women discussing the problems of them having a relationship, Merlin leaves without saying anything. Guest starring Dudley Sutton, Paul Danan and Cressida Whyte Merlin Jameson departs
| 396 | 36 | "Out On a Limb" | Richard Holthouse | Danny McCahon | 17 May 2003 | 9.27 |
A training session at Holby United FC ends with one player, Butch, doing a deliberately hard and crippling tackle on teammate Nobby, who had been flirting with his wife, before being punched by another player. Luke is reluctant to help Butch, who, when he was playing for another club, was responsible for the tackle that ended his career. Nobby's career is over while Butch has a detached retina and may lose his sight in the eye. The manager is criticised for signing Butch, since no-one has accepted him after what he did to Butch. A woman, Karen, gets a phone call from her estranged husband Todd indicating he is going to commit suicide, distracting her so she drives into a skip. A man has either fallen or jumped off a cliff. A GP, Chris, has taken charge and attempts to overrule Fin, who wants to prioritise an unstable pelvis, insisting on stabilising him because of a head injury. Fin ends up taking him to A&E against instructions where Harry backs up his diagnosis. Jack tells Tony that he intends to use the money Eddie left him to leave the area and take Nikki with him as his wife. After most of the department hear first, Jack publicly proposes to Nikki and she accepts. Josh and Colette meet Penny who says neither of them are a carrier for the baby's chromosome problems. Josh realises he isn't the father and throws Colette out. Guest starring Oliver Cotton, Rachel Scorgie and Abdul Salis
| 397 | 37 | "Baby Blues" | Tania Diez | Julie White | 31 May 2003 | 8.03 |
Colette tells Simon the baby is his and the abnormalities came from him. Simon provokes a fight with Josh, earning a telling off from Harry. Nikki tries to resign but Josh refuses to accept it. She successfully revives a patient who arrests while she is on her own and tells Jack that as a compromise she will go travelling with him for six months after they get married. The patient turns out to have end stage cardiomyopathy and asks not to be revived if he arrests again. A co-worker goes to look for his wife but finds their flat empty and uncared for. The patient admits the woman he claimed to have married died when they were eighteen and he hasn't been in a relationship since. His co-worker keeps him company until he dies. A woman collapses in reception from low blood sugar; she has a benign tumour which leaks insulin and is due to have an operation at St. James'. Colette accompanies her in the ambulance when she is transferred there but is unrestrained when Nikki has to brake sharply, suffering a bump. She later starts bleeding and, back at the hospital, learns the placenta has detached and the baby has died. Josh stays with her as the baby is induced. A badly beaten man, Kamal, is dumped in front of Lara and Bex. He is initially unco-operative and demands drugs but is later calmer. It turns out his tendons have been slashed and he won't be able to walk for months. Vinnay turns up, initially claiming to be Kamal's cousin, but in fact is responsible for his injuries after Kamal crossed him. Kamal tells Lara he has done beatings for Vinnay and can't report him without incriminating himself. Vinnay tells Jack it was him that Eddie stole from and he wants the money back. Guest starring Andy Rashleigh, Rachid Sabitri and Shirley King
| 398 | 38 | "Last Man Standing" | Tim Holloway | Rod Lewis | 7 June 2003 | 8.22 |
Josh and Fin are reluctant to work with Simon when they bring in a patient who has overdosed, so Harry and Dillon took over the case. Cal, a friend of the patient, turns up and tries to get something from his bag but Harry and Dillon find it is full of heroin. Jack and Nikki are booking their honeymoon when they stumble across a fight at the travel agent's: Keith has found his wife Maeve going on holiday with his best friend Dean. They all end up at the hospital where Dean tries to give Maeve the money for the holiday. Dean is later found stabbed to death in the toilets; Keith is prime suspect and has a heart attack while being interrogated. However, when Cal is brought in after overdosing, Roxy discovers Dean's money and blood on him and he is arrested. Keith refuses to take Maeve back. A Holby United fan who deliberately started a fight with Holby City fans is brought in by the police; he is wanted for credit card fraud. Simon learns he has refused treatment for terminal lung cancer, which his brother died from, simply taking pain medication. However, further investigation shows he left before getting his diagnosis and actually has TB: He deliberately gave up his money, job and home and drove his girlfriend away by stealing her credit cards, thinking he was dying. Simon reunites him with his girlfriend. Luke and Lara go for a drink and she invites him back to hers. Vinnay and a henchman smash up Jack's flat and threaten Tony. Jack tells Tony he only has a third of Eddie's money and intends to use it to take Nikki and get away. Colette is discharged and tells Charlie she's resigning. Josh fails to stop her leaving and tells Simon he's going to ruin his life. Guest starring Raymond Coulthard, Anthony Ofoegbu and Jane Slavin Colette Griffiths departs
| 399 | 39 | "Three in a Bed" | Ian White | Joe Turner | 14 June 2003 | 7.71 |
Lara wakes up alone in bed in Luke's flat with no memory of the previous night. After teasing her throughout the day, Luke tells her nothing happened after they got back there. Lara treats a darts player who has injured his arm prior to his rankings match. She agrees to discharge him but he collapses in reception. It turns out his friend laced his drink with beta blockers because he bet against him. The player refuses to let Lara call the police. A man with a dislocated arm is put on heavy painkillers while it is relocated. To the staff's bemusement, his wife, knowing he won't remember it, proceeds to confess to the many indiscretions during their whole marriage, including the fact one of their children might not be his. Vinnay again approaches Jack, threatening Nikki, and later learns from Nikki that she and Jack are going away after the wedding. Josh and Nikki witness a car crash into a parked vehicle at a service station, leaving a young boy, David Laing, trapped inside. Simon volunteers to attend to give pain relief but ends up sedating David. In the ambulance, it is discovered he has a cerebral bleed and he dies in Resus. Josh tells the childminder that the drugs Simon gave him masked his symptoms and she passes the news on to the parents, who threaten Harry and Simon with legal action. Guest starring Pete Dunwell, Steve Garti and Liza Sadovy
| 400 | 40 | "A Special Day" | Declan O'Dwyer | Gregory Evans | 21 June 2003 | 8.87 |
It is Jack and Nikki's wedding day; Dillon is giving the bride away and has spent the night with Bex. However, Vinnay stops the wedding car with his henchman, kidnapping Nikki and shooting Dillon when he tries to intervene. At the hospital, a young couple are brought in after being in a minor motorbike accident; the lad let the girl drive the bike and she crashed into roadworks. Roxy is worried when the girl has vision problems but Simon realises it is because she took her glasses off; she wears them when she meets the boy again. Simon is suspended pending an investigation into the incident with David Laing. Dillon is rushed in and twice needs surgery but is later reported to be recovering. Vinnay messages Jack, who tries to rescue Nikki by following Vinnay to a boat and then arranging to meet him on a bridge but is captured and shot in the leg. Tony alerts the police, who arrest Vinnay and his henchman but not before they have set the boat on fire. The injured Jack pushes Nikki overboard and she swims to Tony on the docks, where they see the boat explode with Jack on board. Guest starring Nigel Barrett, Ed Browning and Frances Simon Jack Vincent is killed. Dillon Cahill and Tony Vincent depart.
