= Casualty series 11 =

Eleventh series of Casualty

Casualty
- Series 11
- Starring: Peter Birch; Vas Blackwood; Ian Bleasdale; Lisa Coleman; Sorcha Cusack; Sue Devaney; Ganiat Kasumu; Jonathan Kerrigan; Clive Mantle; Jason Merrells; Gray O'Brien; Derek Thompson; Julia Watson
- No. of episodes: 24

Release
- Original network: BBC One
- Original release: 14 September 1996 – 22 February 1997

Series chronology
- ← Previous; Series 10 Next → Series 12

The eleventh series of the British medical drama television series Casualty commenced airing in the United Kingdom on BBC One on 14 September 1996 and finished on 22 February 1997.

== Production ==
Ros Anderson took over from Corinne Hollingworth as producer for this series.

Key moments from the series include the joyful arrival of Charlie and Baz's baby boy, Louis, the tragic loss of Josh's wife and children in a devastating house fire and the gripping series finale in which Jude narrowly survives a brutal stabbing. Baby Louis was portrayed by ten-day-old Max, who had been born at the very hospital in Bristol where the birth scenes were filmed. To authentically recreate the delivery for the episode, lubricating jelly and theatrical blood were applied, allowing Max to be "born" once more on screen.

== Cast ==
=== Overview ===
The eleventh series of Casualty features a cast of characters working in the emergency department of Holby City Hospital. The series began with 8 roles with star billing. Clive Mantle starred as emergency medicine consultant Mike Barratt. Julia Watson appeared as specialist registrar Barbara "Baz" Hayes. Derek Thompson continued his role as charge nurse Charlie Fairhead while Sorcha Cusack portrayed ward sister Kate Wilson. Lisa Coleman appeared as staff nurse Jude Korcanik. Ian Bleasdale and Sue Devaney starred as paramedics Josh Griffiths and Liz Harker. Jason Merrells portrayed receptionist Matt Hawley. Soo Drouet guest starred throughout the series as Monica, an anaesthetist.

Jonathan Kerrigan, Ganiat Kasumu and Gray O'Brien were introduced at the beginning of the series as staff nurses Sam Colloby and Gloira Hammond and senior house officer Richard McCaig. Clive Mantle returned to the cast in episode one as emergency medicine consultant Mike Barratt following his departure in the previous series. Mantle left the cast in episode ten and was replaced by Peter Birch in the following episode as emergency medicine consultant Jack Hathaway. Vas Blackwood was introduced as receptionist David Sinclair and left the show at the conclusion of the series. Donna Alexander appeared in episodes seventeen, twenty and twenty-one as paramedic Penny Hutchens, while Lucy Cohu appeared between episode eighteen and twenty-three as Jayne Bazeley, a love interest for Jack.

Both Lisa Coleman and Jason Merrells departed at the end of the series. Coleman quit the series due to the demands of filming and dealing with fame. In December 1996, she quoted "I'm leaving Casualty in February and I’m not even sure I want to act anymore." Merrells similarly left due the demands of filming on his home life and wanting a new challenge.

=== Main characters ===
- Peter Birch as Jack Hathaway (from episode 11)
- Vas Blackwood as David Sinclair (episodes 21−24)
- Ian Bleasdale as Josh Griffiths
- Lisa Coleman as Jude Korcanik (until episode 24)
- Sorcha Cusack as Kate Wilson
- Sue Devaney as Liz Harker
- Ganiat Kasumu as Gloria Hammond (episodes 1−24)
- Jonathan Kerrigan as Sam Colloby (from episode 2)
- Clive Mantle as Mike Barratt (episodes 1−10)
- Jason Merrells as Matt Hawley (until episode 24)
- Gray O'Brien as Richard McCaig (from episode 1)
- Derek Thompson as Charlie Fairhead
- Julia Watson as Barbara "Baz" Hayes (until episode 1, from episode 9)

=== Recurring and guest characters ===
- Donna Alexander as Penny Hutchens (episodes 17−21)
- Lucy Cohu as Jayne Bazeley (episodes 18−23)
- Soo Drouet as Monica (from episode 1)
- Michael N. Harbour as Trevor Wilson (until episode 10)

== Episodes ==
No. overall	No. in series	Title	Directed by	Written by	Original release date	UK viewers (millions)
177	1	"Chain Reactions" (Note: See also "Chain Reaction" series 4 & "Chain Reaction" series 30)	Roger Gartland	Andrew Holden	14 September 1996	21.04
Mike is back at the department to oversee the launch of a new Resus unit. Kate is now sister but her husband Trevor has been left in a vegetative state after his accident. Jude and new SHO Richard McCaig help Dorothea (Rosie Marcel) a woman who has a tampon stuck in her cervix. Brothers Rick and Toby (Jake Wood and Eddie Marsan) work with security guard Greg on a warehouse robbery. When Greg's boss comes back unexpectedly, Greg tells the brothers to lock him in the warehouse but manages to set off the fireworks inside by damaging a fuse box and is killed in the explosion. In the confusion, Toby falls and hits his head, dying in hospital. Rick is arrested and admits he only did the robberies because Rick was suffering from depression after losing his arm in a car accident. Baz is on the maternity ward and Charlie is dividing his time between her and the department; he rushes to be by her side as their son Louis Charles is born by caesarean. A mother, Sarah (Lynsey Baxter), is distraught when her husband walks out on her and drives off with her two children. She goes to a pub alone where she suffers a panic attack. It is eventually discovered she left the children tied up in her car boot. She is admitted for psychiatric care.
178	2	"Relative Values"	Graeme Harper	Chris Lang	21 September 1996	19.88
Charlie and Kate are interviewing for a staff nurse position and decide to employ Sam Colloby. Van driver Len Chesham (Ken Jones) falls asleep at the wheel and blames his neighbour Ron Legget for keeping him awake with loud music. During a Viking/Saxon battle re-enactment, Len bites off Ron's finger and refuses to return it unless he apologises. When Ron insults him, Len eats the finger. Ron respects him and doesn't press charges; in fact, Len mimed eating it and surreptitiously places it in the bin. Nine-year-old Adam has an infected penis and his mother Shelley suspects her estranged husband Ray has been abusing him; Richard learns Adam had been trying to stretch it because Shelley said he was a child like his father. A young woman, Amy, goes for dialysis. She and her twin sister Fay are later involved in a car crash. Charlie, who has joined Josh and Liz on the ambulances, helps treat them but Mike realises Fay is likely to be brain dead. Father John (Glyn Owen) is guilty that he had preferred Fay to survive; mother Susan (Gillian Raine) suggests she could be a kidney donor for Amy. Josh, Richard and Matt bet on the outcome of a City/United football match; Richard loses because of a goal that may have been offside and learns a man left waiting in reception for hours to have a splinter removed was supposed to be linesman. Kate sees consultant Dr. Elliott using Trevor's case for teaching purposes but refuses to accept he will never recover, as he has shown no sign of improvement from his vegetative state since his accident months earlier.
179	3	"It Ain't Me, Babe"	Michael Owen Morris	Rob Gittins	28 September 1996	—
A man named Steve (Grant Masters) hits his head at a garage while arguing with a mechanic who won't pass his MOT. Jude recognises him as an ex-boyfriend: He left her for Paula, the mother of his son Craig (Nicholas Hoult). Steve initially claims Paula is dead, but in fact he ran off with Craig after she was granted custody. When Jude calls Paula, Steve tries to leave with Craig but collapses and dies from a heart condition he had been ignoring. Teenager Clare convinces her boyfriend Gareth to try and steal a bird's egg for money but the bird attacks him and he is left hanging from a cliff. Rescuer Jon has his arm go numb while helping him, causing them both to fall. Mike and Charlie go to the scene with a medical team. Jon admits to Richard that he has been diagnosed with rheumatism but had kept working anyway. Clare dumps Gareth and Sam convinces him he is better off without her. A middle-aged woman, Ruth (Lynn Farleigh), puts sleeping tablets in her husband Frank's drink, but he then goes out again without telling her and falls asleep at the wheel, suffering a minor accident. Ruth admits to Kate that she has been drugging him because she finds sex painful; it turns out she has endocarditis, which is treatable.
180	4	"Thicker Than Water" (Note: See also "Thicker Than Water" series 17)	David Penn	Kate Lock	5 October 1996	19.76
Two teenagers, Robbie and Jess (Ashley Jensen), turn up in the city looking for their mother Madeleine. They find her in a gambling den but she refuses to talk to them and one of her acquaintances, Gibbs, pushes Robbie down some stairs. Robbie insists on staying to look for Madeleine again but Sam gives Jess £200 he won on the pools to get home. Middle-aged Stan (John Cater) is moving in with his girlfriend Jean (Daphne Oxenford); his disabled wife Florence (Miriam Karlin) is in a nursing home but expects to come home. She ends up going back to their flat on her own but finds it rented out to a young black man called Kevin. Realising what is going on, she knocks some scaffolding over on herself and dies in hospital, having lost the will to live. A woman, Kerry, asks Richard for pills to cope with jetlag but he discovers she can't take them since she is pregnant. A boy named Darren fakes illness to get Sam and Gloria to look at his pet ferret, who then escapes. Matt wants to ask out Gloria, but before he can do so she arranges to go out with Sam and his boyfriend Steve.
181	5	"Waterwings"	Laurence Moody	Simon Stirling	12 October 1996	—
Jim (David Daker), a worker at a sports centre, accidentally spills some chemicals into water. The manager, Kay, tells him he may be made redundant. Delivery man Pete is left stacking chlorine on his own and spills some in the water, creating a toxic reaction. The fumes kill Pete and spread into a pool where a class of paraplegics have to be evacuated. A group of medical students observe the treatment. Richard suffers blurred vision while putting stitches in Kay, who hit her head in the chaos, but dismisses it as a headache. Kay works out a way to keep Jim on but he is wracked with guilt on learning of Pete's death. Josh and Liz are called out when a tramp, Harry, collapses in the street but a drug addict, Kev (Jason Hughes), tries to get drugs from the ambulance before being run over by a police car. Harry dies in hospital and Kev's brother Danny disowns him. Richard helps an asthma sufferer, Vicky, deal with her over-protective husband Warren. Gloria's landlord, with whom she had a brief fling, dumps her bags at the hospital and tells her she's evicted.
182	6	"Still Waters"	Robert Gabriel	Manjit Singh	19 October 1996	—
Josh and Liz have undergone training for a new air ambulance. Teenage boy David is brought in with apparent poisoning. His father Jonathan discovers a computer printout relating to magic mushrooms in his room. Mike realises he used deathcap by mistake and admits him for observation. An elderly war veteran, McClean, ignores a gang of youths led by Kenny stealing from Ugandan shopkeeper Sharma and pelting him with fruit. Sharma asks him to go to the police with him but Kenny breaks into McClean's allotment shed and sets off a grenade he kept as a souvenir; McClean is injured and Kenny loses a leg. McClean tells Gloria that all his friends have died but he begins to bond with Sharma. Junior lawyer Joanna beats up her superior Nigel when he makes a pass at her; a friend's father assaulted her when she was young. Colleague Miranda tells her Nigel tries it on with all the girls and they tell his wife everything. Matt tries to make money selling scratchcards only for Oscar to win £500. Kate's daughter Lorna tells her she and her brothers are considering withdrawing Trevor's feeding tube after a year; Kate agrees to think about it.
183	7	"Nightfall"	Sallie Aprahamian	Simon Ashdown	26 October 1996	16.97
Josh and Liz are called to a boathouse where an old woman, Lily, tells them her granddaughter Lucy has fallen through the roof. When Lucy is fit by debris, Josh inserts a chest drain under instruction from Mike but Lucy later dies in Resus. Anna (Jacquetta May) gives medicine to her baby son Peter, who has a degenerative neurological disorder. When her young daughter Natasha gives him an extra dose, Anna delays taking him to hospital, wondering if it would be kinder to let him die. Kate learns the truth but sympathises and helps Anna come up with a cover story. Older man Phil (David Hayman) and youngster Ryan go after Parker, the drug dealer who sold drugs to Phil's daughter Karen when she died of an overdose. Ryan puts a stop to Phil's assault on him and they end up in a car accident that leaves Ryan badly hurt. Ryan tells Phil Karen's death was her own fault for mixing drugs. Richard and Matt stop Phil attacking Parker again and he breaks down in tears.
184	8	"Vital Signs"	Tim Prager	Barbara Machin	2 November 1996	16.78
A homeless woman, Gerry (Sara Kestelman), comes in drunk and Gloria discharges her after finding nothing wrong with her. She later falls into a skip after messing about on a building site. Jude ignores Mike's instructions to repeat an x-ray and when Gerry falls off a trolley she breaks her neck, having damaged it in the initial fall. Her sister Lydia abandons her. Richard collapses while treating a patient, Chivers; he convinces his colleagues it is simply a bad ankle but in fact he has been diagnosed with multiple sclerosis. A boy, Ravi, is having his birthday party run by his bickering grandmothers, Priya and Vera (Colette O'Niel). He suffers bad burns while trying to retrieve a guy from a bonfire. His mother Julia (Amita Dhiri) tells the grandmothers that they are moving away but invites them to come along. Jamie, an RAF pilot, is returning to duty after an accident but is scared of flying again and ends up suffering a fit; he has epilepsy. He then starts choking and Kate and Gloria discover he took an overdose of paracetamol when his wife Sally left him; they have been eating away at his liver and his chances of survival are now slim.
185	9	"Another Day in Paradise"	Tony McHale	Tony McHale	9 November 1996	18.34
Teenager Gabby, whose mother Mandy runs a caravan park, sneaks away from school and spends time with a family staying in one of the caravans; she tells the oldest daughter Kayleigh that she gets bullied because of Mandy buying her unwanted expensive gifts. An argument between Mandy and Kayleigh's father Alan results in a Land Rover rolling back into the caravan and overturning it with Gabby and Kayleigh inside. Josh and Liz take them to hospital in the air ambulance. Kayleigh reveals Alan skipped bail after hitting a drunk driver who killed her mother and brother but claimed his girlfriend was driving; Jude keeps quiet and Kayleigh convinces Alan to take the other children and leave. An older woman, Eileen, convinces her son Johnny to sing to the crowd in reception but while he is doing so she dies. Kate and her children are told that Trevor has pneumonia; they decide to let nature take its course and allow him to die. A woman called Gill (Jenny Funnell) brings in a young builder, Noel (Orlando Bloom), who has cut his arm open with a chisel. When he comes back in with the wound reopened, Charlie and Richard learn he has a history of self-harming to get women's attention. Charlie breaks patient confidentiality to tell Gill, who had already worked it out for herself. Noel is later brought in again after jumping off the top of a multi-storey car park.
186	10	"Flesh and Blood"	John Bruce	Lilie Ferrari	16 November 1996	17.79
Kate and her family are visiting Trevor, who does not have long left after contracting pneumonia. Nick admits to Matt that he regrets letting Trevor die. Trevor passes away not longer after. An elderly woman, Alice (Judy Campbell), turns up covered in blood but with no injuries; she has Alzheimer's. Her husband George is brought in after falling off a ladder and accepts help from Social Services. Young teenager Shaz plays truant at the mall before accepting a lift from a young truck driver, Jimmy (Ben Price). When she experiences bad stomach pains, he calls an ambulance and leaves her by the road. Her parents assume she is pregnant but in fact she has started menstruating but the blood has had nowhere to go, meaning it has built up inside her body. While her parents are arguing, she slips away and leaves with Jimmy. Gloria has arranged a blood drive but Liz is unable to donate since she has just had a tattoo done. Josh and Liz get Mike to a surprise farewell drink before he goes back to South Africa. Richard and Gloria go for dinner together, while Charlie and Mike witness Matt and Jude kiss and go back to his place.
187	11	"Made in Britain"	Romey Allison	Lisa Evans	23 November 1996	—
A girl, Ruby, is dropped off with an injured arm. New consultant Jack Hathaway defies procedure and resets it without contacting her parents. Baz and Jude learn Ruby and her sister Tina are working in a factory underage and she got her arm caught in a machine; the owner, Clark, gives her money to keep quiet and the staff are unable to convince her to report him. Matt and Jude agree to put their night together down to experience. At an old people's home, two old ladies, Mary and Binnie (Anna Wing and Phyllis Calvert), are trying to stop their friend Jessie (Jean Anderson) being moved away since they consider each other family. Jessie suffers a stroke and is rushed to hospital. Pregnant woman Faith is trying to get groom Owen to his wedding when she is nearly hit by a cyclist and Owen falls over and injures his wrist pulling her out of the way. Richard reveals he has osteoporosis, leaving him with brittle bones. Faith goes into labour and Richard, Gloria and Sam deliver the baby around the same time Jessie dies of a second stroke; Binnie suspects he is her reincarnation. It transpires that Owen is Faith's father not her fiancé when her partner Danny turns up; Faith has been trying to get her parents, Owen and Joy, to get married after decades living together, but they eventually conclude they are happy as they are. A man is brought in after falling off a roof and Jack drills burr holes despite Baz wanting to wait for the neurosurgeons.
188	12	"Mother's Little Helper"	Ian White	Peter Mills	30 November 1996	—
A deaf girl, Rachel, arrives home to find her pregnant mother, Linda, collapsed. She tries to go to Mrs Desai, an Asian woman who runs a local shop, for help but is attacked by their rottweiler dog in their yard and rushed to hospital. There, Sam communicates with her by sign language and sends an ambulance for Linda. She goes into premature labour and the baby dies. Mrs Desai, who had initially lied to the police, eventually has the dog taken away. She tells Jude she and her husband were abandoned by their families after marrying without permission and he now has dementia; Jude arranges for Rachel and Linda to stay with them. Baz goes home to be with Louis when she learns he has an ear infection. Charlie helps Matt deal with the fall out of losing his temper with a troublesome patient. Overbearing mother Rita is organising her daughter Brenda's wedding, while her husband Ralph is reluctant to stand up to her. Groom Mark has a fit during the vows. Sam is chastised by Charlie for telling his family he has epilepsy before a diagnosis has been made, but Jack tells them he will have to give up his job driving coaches. Rita faints after abusing over the counter tranquillisers, so Ralph arranges to take over Mark's job and has Mark and Brenda married at the hospital, convincing Rita it was her idea.
189	13	"Trapped"	Alan Bell	Andrew Holden	7 December 1996	20.13
A woman, Candice (Suzanne Packer), is found dumped in a river, tied up. At the hospital, Jack and Charlie discover she has swallowed drugs. Detective Inspector Logan (David Schofield) arrives to interview her; Sam discovers he is actually her boyfriend and has been forcing her to give him a cut of the drugs. When he realises that Logan was the one who dumped her in the river, trying to kill her, he makes a statement and Jack and Richard discover they have videoed Logan threatening Candice. Gloria's ex-boyfriend Jeff (Derek Riddell) turns up; when she refuses to speak to him, he registers as a patient, claiming he has stomach pains, but Richard gets rid of him by threatening a rectal examination. Kate returns to work and tells Dr Eliot (Jonathan Newth) she wants to donate Trevor's life insurance to medical research; he tells her to wait before deciding. Jude visits a doctor on her break and learns she is pregnant. Paul and Jane (Jane Hazlegrove), a couple on medication for psychiatric issues, are planning a bike trip but Paul falls and breaks his leg. Jane rides off on her bike with Matt on the back but he convinces her to return to hospital.
190	14	"Do You Believe in Fairies?"	Johnathan Young	Deborah Cook	14 December 1996	—
A six-year-old girl, Harriet, is devastated when her father Tom tells her Father Christmas does not exist and runs straight through a green house. Jude is sympathetic and Matt offers to arrange for a visit from the Santa Claus from children's ward. Harriet sees someone dressed as Santa and tells Jude, only for Matt to reveal the Santa had the flu...Youngster Paul is doing work experience with piano tuner George. They get into an argument and Paul threatens to smash a violin George made. George smashes it himself and the string hits him in the face. He offers Paul a job when he leaves school. Tim, an old friend of Matt's now working as a vicar, arrives at the hospital to hear from Jack that his six-year-old niece Molly is dead and sister Josie (Eva Pope) has been badly injured after being hit by a drunk driver when on their way home from a school nativity service, and has to be restrained from attacking the man. Richard and Gloria go away together over Christmas. Jude asks to speak to Matt later but changes her mind on hearing he is considering going to work at his brother's bar in Crete.
191	15	"The Dying of the Light"	Indra Bhose	Christopher Reason	21 December 1996	—
Tom, a 70-year-old man who suffered a stroke some time ago and is now suffering from dementia, is taken to a care home by his son David. There, he becomes aggressive and struggles with staff before falling down stairs. He is taken into hospital with a broken ankle but suffers another stroke and dies in Resus. Jude meets with a pregnant woman, Shaheera, who has had six miscarriages and is now suffering from blurred vision. She admits she once had an abortion but Jack and Richard discover she has toxoplasmosis, unrelated to the abortion, and the baby is fine. Flamboyant music hall director Ronnie is trying to put on a Christmas pageant with help from his reluctant star man Max, who is taken with new soprano Eleanor. The venue has failed to advertise the pageant so no-one turns up, and Max calls an ambulance when Eleanor suffers from a sore throat. Eleanor has an epiglotic abscess: The surgery is simple put it may affect her singing voice. Ronnie admits to Max that he loves him and Max learns Eleanor has a boyfriend. Matt hires Max and Ronnie as cabaret for the staff's James Bond-themed Christmas party. Kate is upset when a song reminds her of Trevor and Jack takes her home. Jude tells Matt of her pregnancy; after initially being shocked, he tells her he will stand by her and cares about her.
192	16	"The Homecoming"	Tim Prager	Chris Lang	28 December 1996	—
Michael Walend is released from prison after serving 15 years for the murder of a young girl and goes home to his mother Mary (Avril Elgar), who still lives in the area where the murder happened. Despite pleas from Peter, the father of his victim, for them to drop it, a vigilante mob drag him out of his home and beat him. In hospital, the self-loathing Michael tries to goad Peter into killing him but he refuses. Another prisoner, Perry (Perry Fenwick), returns home to his wife Nula (Matilda Zeigler), who collapses soon after. At hospital, Perry discovers she is pregnant. In fact, the child is his, conceived when he was allowed out for his grandmother's funeral months earlier, but Nula is leaving him anyway. She has a clot in her heart but, even though she plans to have an abortion, Jack refuses to give her medication that would harm the baby, and she ends up dying in surgery. Andy, a member of a Hare Krishnas group, is brought in with a cut arm. He speaks to his father John for the first time in ten years and they make their peace. Jude tells Matt she is going to have an abortion and he offers to go with her. Gloria finds out about Richard's MS.
193	17	"Hidden Depths"	Beryl Richards	Simon Stirling	4 January 1997	18.90
Josh is on air ambulance duty. A woman, Shirley, takes her children, Jimmy and Bill, to watch her boyfriend Kim and his friend Mick go scuba diving. When everyone is distracted by Kim jetting himself trapped, the boys wander off and Jimmy falls off a cliff into the water. He is air lifted to the hospital where he has an emergency heart operation. Liz and her temporary partner Penny bring in a couple, Gordon and Fiona; she suffered a seizure while performing oral sex and he hit her with a lamp to stop her biting him. James (Jason Connery), the owner of a stately home which wife Charlotte is trying to run as a business, is hiding his sister Angel in the stables after she backed out of going on a course Charlotte arranged. She throws up on the drive during a business dinner and turns out to have food poisoning. When she learns Charlotte is pregnant, she is more encouraging of the marriage. Louis is brought in by his nanny Margaret after fitting; it turns out he had been left too close to a radiator.
194	18	"Tall Tales"	Robin Shepperd	David Joss Buckley	11 January 1997	—
At an outward bound centre, a man, Bryan, walks into the women's changing room despite his wife Aileen (Abigail Thaw) trying to point out his mistake, catching several women in a state of undress. Aileen later falls off a rope traverse and is taken to hospital. She is uncomfortable with Charlie's ministrations, especially when he attaches ECG wires to her chest, and later tells Kate she wants to report him for sexual harassment. Jack meets with Jayne Bazeley (Lucy Cohu), an artist hired to paint a mural above reception. A man, Leicester, comes in with a rash on his genitals; it eventually turns out his wife put itching powder in his underpants to punish him for his infidelity. Josh and Liz are called out to see a well-off man, Martin (Ronald Pickup), who has chest pains. He claims the pain is from his twin brother Reg, from whom he has been estranged for some years. Reg is later found in a bad way and dies in hospital. Martin's pain stops but Richard warns him the condition is hereditary and as he is leaving the hospital he collapses. Margaret brings in Louis again. She is left to take a urine sample, which is full of blood and he later stops breathing while she is alone with him. Jack realises she filled the urine sample with chicken's blood and attempted to smother Louis: She has Munchausen's Syndrome and is admitted for psychiatric care.
195	19	"Déjà Vu" (Note: See also "Déjà Vu" series 17)	Tim O'Mara	Lilie Ferrari	18 January 1997	—
Charlie and the rest of the staff are interviewed by Personnel over the sexual harassment complaint. He is ordered to take leave. A reporter, Jeremy, harasses Charlie and tries to get in to see him by registering as a patient but Baz throws him out. A woman, Cathy, learns that her husband Chalky (Michael Feast), due in court that day, has got her sister Sheila pregnant. She deliberately drives her car into the prison van carrying him, badly injuring one of the guards, Ben. She escapes charges when it turns out her brakes were faulty. She tells Sheila she is taking the children and leaving them both to it. The other guard, Ken, is recognised by Inspector Rossi as a man wanted for a spate of burglaries eight years previous. However, while arresting him he leaves the other prisoner from the van, Dean, unguarded and he escapes by stealing Jeremy's car. Matt supports Jude when she has her abortion; afterwards, she tells her flat mate Donna (Diane Parish) that there is more to Matt than she thought.
196	20	"Treasure"	Ken Hannam	Lisa Evans	25 January 1997	—
Matt hands in his resignation, having decided to take the job in Crete. Sam recognises David Rossi, an old colleague of Trevor's that Kate has been spending time with, from gay bars. A newly retired man, Andy (Miles Anderson), has been doing odd jobs for his neighbours. While he is clearing out an old well, it collapses on him. His wife Lotty (Ellie Haddington) learns he has been convincing his customers to let him sell their antiques and then keeping most of the money for himself; she leaves him. Joan (Edna Doré), an elderly lady who's had a fall, gets chatting to Walker, a builder who hurt his hand but had been feeling ill for some time, while waiting in reception. She has been spending most of her time watching soap operas since her son emigrated and works out that he has MG from seeing it diagnosed in The Flying Doctors. A woman, Helen, returns home with her two children, Sarah and Ashley. When she turns on a kettle, the house is engulfed in a fireball. When Josh and Liz get the call, it is revealed they are Josh's family. Helen and Ashley are declared dead at the scene and Sarah dies in Resus.
197	21	"United... By Blood"	Tony McHale	Tony McHale	1 February 1997	—
Matt is showing the ropes to his replacement, David Sinclair (Vas Blackwood), but Jude turns down an offer to go to Crete with him. A boy, Edward, is brought in by his father Craig and uncle Tim, but refuses to talk to Richard and Sam, leading them to suspect abuse. When his mother Paula turns up, she learns he fell down the stairs after finding Craig and Tim were having an affair and manages to reassure Richard. The warring families Lowthers and Muldowney descend on the department: Lowther grandmother Maggie was attacked and beaten in her home and her grandsons beat up Muldowney boy Conway in revenge. In fact, he is innocent; he has been seeing their sister Zoe, who is pregnant with his child. A fight in reception sees younger Lowther boy Lee knocked off a balcony and exposed as the culprit: Maggie disturbed him stealing money to pay his gambling debts. The older boys are arrested and a plea from grandfather Bill and the revelation of the pregnancy sees the mothers make a tentative truce.
198	22	"Make Believe"	Peter Barber-Fleming	Kate Lock	8 February 1997	17.23
Charlie returns to work, having received a formal reprimand. Josh has also returned, having been staying with Liz and her husband, but breaks down on a shout when he can't bring himself to drive past the remains of his old house. Domenique, an old girlfriend of Richard's, joins the staff as a medical student but it turns out she has been letting her own blood to relive stress and she admits she doesn't really want to do medicine. A young mother, Kerry (Lucy Speed), brings in her critically ill son Daniel, who dies of meningitis. Office personnel officer Anita gets her friend Cassie the file of Jerry, a colleague she has feelings for. They see Jerry stabbed by a man who forces him to take part in a ram raid. Cassie tells the ambulance staff he is haemophiliac and he wonders how she knew; Anita smooths it over, claiming she looked up his file because of the injury, and Jerry asks Cassie out. Jack invites Baz to apply for a consultancy and Richard to apply for a registrar position; Richard tells him about his MS. At Matt's leaving do, he and Sam get into a fight with some pool players. Jude takes them back to the hospital to patch them up and they walk in on Jack and Jayne kissing. Matt and Jude share an emotional goodbye kiss.
199	23	"Monday, Bloody Monday"	Graeme Harper	Barbara Machin	15 February 1997	15.98
Josh feels responsible after hearing the fire was down to wear and tear on the gas pipes to the boiler. Jude is missing Matt and David tries to convince her to follow him to Crete. Josh and Liz are called out to Carol, a woman has drunk anti-freeze, but she refuses to go with them and they have to wait until she is unconscious. Although the staff save her, she says she will just try again. Her neighbour Helen admits they haven’t spoken since Carol's daughter was killed in a car crash when Helen was driving; Kate convinces her to speak to her. An attempt to take Carol to the wards goes wrong when equipment fails and Charlie lectures Kate, Jude and agency nurse Justine for not checking it. Jayne has a minor accident in the car crash when she runs into a car containing two old ladies, Edith and Marjorie (Deddie Davies and Brenda Cowling). A mole on Marjorie’s neck is non-malignant but Edith collapses and dies while leaving. Andy, a man who took a drug overdose, dies in Resus. His stepdaughter Alice comes to the hospital and Jude takes her to see the body. Kate deals with brawling couple Clifford and Ruby; Ruby threatens her with a knife but she declines to press charges. Ken, a man with manic depression, parades around the department half-naked believing himself to be an Aztec and then disappears. Jude is found bleeding to death after she is stabbed.
200	24	"Perfect Blue"	Graeme Harper	Barbara Machin	22 February 1997	16.42
Jude is rushed into Resus and Jack realises the knife pieced her heart and caused a tamponade; she is rushed into theatre. The police suspect Ken, and Alice is found wandering the corridors in a state of shock, with minor knife wounds. Chased by the police, Kevin jumps from the hospital roof, believing himself to be a bird. Miraculously, he only suffers minor injuries and is admitted for psychiatric care. Sam and Kate finally realise from Alice's ramblings that she stabbed Jude; hating her stepfather, she has a history of self-harm and drug abuse, and panicked when Jude told her she had to talk to the police. Josh and Liz bring in William (Maurice Denham), an elderly man who was left lying in his house with only his dog for company; he has deteriorated so much his leg needs to be amputated. Gloria realise he is deaf, not senile, and his mood improves when his neighbour, Erica (Ursula Howells), who he has barely spoken to before, offers to look after him and his dog. Josh loses it with a woman, Pat, who called an ambulance for a toothache, and finally breaks down in Liz's arms. Matt races back to the country on hearing what has happened to Jude and sits by her side in intensive care; he tells her he loves her as she regains consciousness.
