= Casualty series 4 =

Fourth series of Casualty

Casualty
- Series 4
- Starring: Ian Bleasdale; Belinda Davidson; Susan Franklyn; Brenda Fricker; William Gaminara; Robson Green; Tam Hoskyns; Geoffery Leesley; Vivienne McKone; Eddie Nestor; Cathy Shipton; Derek Thompson
- No. of episodes: 12

Release
- Original network: BBC One
- Original release: 8 September – 1 December 1989

Series chronology
- ← Previous; Series 3 Next → Series 5

The fourth series of the British medical drama television series Casualty commenced airing in the United Kingdom on BBC One on 8 September 1989 and finished on 1 December 1989.

== Production ==
Peter Norris serves as the producer of series four, replacing original producer Geraint Morris, who left to produce The Bill. He was hired by Jonathan Powell, the head of drama at the BBC, following his work on The Rainbow. Norris admitted that he jumped at the chance to produce Casualty. He then hired a casting director and worked with script editor Susan Gander to create new characters. Casualty is based in the fictional city of Holby, which was originally localised to Bristol, where the drama is filmed. Norris wanted to change this and removed the show's obvious Bristolian mannerisms. One of these included Duffy's West Country accent, which was dropped suddenly, as well as the introduction of Geordie character Jimmy Powell.

The drama was moved to a post-watershed Friday night time slot from a Saturday night time slot for this series. Shipton explained that producers wanted to create an "urban feel" to the show by moving it to a later time slot. Norris wanted to use this opportunity to portray "tougher" stories, so he hired writers who wanted to tell stories about special issues and gave them the freedom to do so. While the first three series of Casualty explored the political side of the NHS, Norris wanted series four to explore social issues which were not portrayed in the media. The change in time slot and difference in stories proved successful and ratings grew to over 13 million viewers.

The series opens with a road accident, described as "spectacular" by Hilary Kingsley, the author of Casualty: The Inside Story. The stunt features the most vehicles the show had included to date and used drums of hydrofluoric acid. During filming, one of the drums was pushed too fast, causing it to head towards the camera crew. Norris confessed that he was completing paperwork about the incident for a year afterwards. The series finale features a terrorist attack at a department store. Norris described the making of the episode "a lark" and compared the set to Gone with the Wind with the blood stains on-set. The episode was scheduled for the same week as a remembrance service for the victims of the 1987 Remembrance Day bombing, which concerned the production team. However, there was no complaints, which Norris accredited to Morris previously defending other series of the drama.

== Cast ==
The main cast of series four.

The fourth series of Casualty features a cast of characters working in the emergency department of Holby City Hospital. Derek Thompson continues his role as charge nurse Charlie Fairhead, while Brenda Fricker plays state enrolled nurse Megan Roach. Cathy Shipton stars as sister Lisa "Duffy" Duffin, and Eddie Nestor appears as staff nurse Cyril James. Geoffrey Leesley portrays paramedic Keith Cotterill, and Susan Franklyn appears as administrator Valerie Sinclair.

Robson Green was cast as Geordie hospital porter Jimmy Powell following the decision to delocalise the show's setting. Three actors were cast in single-series regular roles. Tam Hoskyns joined the cast as senior house officer Lucy Perry, who was billed as "all books and brains but no practice and compassion". Alex Spencer, portrayed by Belinda Davidson, was introduced as a middle-class student nurse, and Julie Stevens, played by Vivienne McKone, appeared as the overcompensating receptionist.

Episode one also marked the first appearance of paramedic Josh Griffiths, portrayed by Ian Bleasdale. The actor had been hired by director Andrew Morgan in a guest role for a couple of episodes and would later join the regular cast in future series. William Gaminara appeared in four episodes as registrar Andrew Bower, who became a love interest for Duffy. He departed after writers decided to create tragedy for the character of Duffy. At the conclusion of the series, Nestor and Franklyn left their roles as Cyril and Valerie, respectively.

=== Main characters ===
- Ian Bleasdale as Josh Griffiths (from episode 1)
- Belinda Davidson as Alex Spencer (episodes 1−12)
- Susan Franklyn as Valerie Sinclair (until episode 12)
- Brenda Fricker as Megan Roach
- William Gaminara as Andrew Bower (episodes 1−4)
- Robson Green as Jimmy Powell (from episode 1)
- Tam Hoskyns as Lucy Perry (episodes 1−12)
- Geoffrey Leesley as Keith Cotterill
- Vivienne McKone as Julie Stevens (episodes 1−12)
- Eddie Nestor as Cyril James (until episode 12)
- Cathy Shipton as Lisa "Duffy" Duffin
- Derek Thompson as Charlie Fairhead

== Episodes ==
No. overall	No. in series	Title	Directed by	Written by	Original release date
41	1	"Chain Reaction" (Note: See also "Chain Reactions" series 11 & "Chain Reaction" series 30)	Andrew Morgan	Ginnie Hole	8 September 1989
New senior house officer Lucy Perry (Tam Hoskyns) treats a young woman with cervical cancer before being called out with paramedic Cyril James (Eddie Nestor) to a road crash. A car has collided with a lorry carrying drums of chemicals and a second car has rolled over killing the driver. A young female hitchhiker is thrown through the car windscreen and has head injuries. The lorry driver needs a chest drain which Lucy performs at the roadside. A policeman is burned by a pool of acid and dies in CRASH as his wife arrives to see him. Note: Title Sequence (patient journey/blue flashes) changed
42	2	"Accidents Happen"	Jeremy Silberston	Bill Gallagher	15 September 1989
A housewife trips on her hoover cable falls downstairs and is found unconscious by her neighbour, a mentally handicapped boy. Her husband angrily accuses the boy of causing the accident. Cyril finds out he lost out on the ITU job to nurse Sally; he becomes annoyed with charge nurse Charlie Fairhead (Derek Thompson). Porter Jimmy Powell (Robson Green) is reprimanded again by Charlie; he pleads with Charlie not to call the head of portering and give him another chance.
43	3	"A Grand in the Hand"	Sue Butterworth	Sam Snape	22 September 1989
A suicidal woman ploughs her Volvo estate into a yellow car containing four young people. Two die instantly and a girl dies in CRASH. A policeman spots cans of lager in the wrecked car and wants to breathalyse the driver who has a serious head injury but Medical registrar Andrew Bower (William Gaminara) tells the policeman that this will prove fatal. Later, the suicidal woman admits the accident was her fault. A worker on a building site slips and hot bitumen falls on him. His boss tries to silence him with £1,000 but his wife won't allow it. Charlie finds state enrolled nurse Megan Roach (Brenda Fricker) stealing Valium and makes her flush it away.
44	4	"Day Off"	Steve Goldie	Jacqueline Holborough	29 September 1989
In the Kings Arm pub, Jimmy finds the pub comedian, Arthur Drury, stabbed in the toilets. He needs a chest drain. Two policemen, DS Prescott and DS Monahan, suspect Jimmy, until they find evidence the killer is a deranged young man, who came in earlier with slashed wrists, but fled. His flatmate is also brought in, after being attacked by him; his skull has caved in and he dies. Student nurse Alex Spencer (Belinda Davidson) gives a patient a painkiller before a doctor sees him, causing Sister Lisa "Duffy" Duffin (Cathy Shipton) to snap at her. It emerges that Duffy is pregnant and when Andrew discusses his new position, Duffy informs him that she will be a single mother and that she does not love him.
45	5	"Vital Spark"	Terry Iland	John Fletcher	6 October 1989
Lucy receives a letter in the post, which makes her angry: she has failed her primary exams. Megan throws her pills down the toilet and receptionist Julie Stevens (Vivienne McKone) jokes with Jimmy that his dancing is not good. An elderly man, Alfred Newcombe (Edward Judd, is out with his grandson, Eric Newcombe (Charlie Creed-Miles), showing him his childhood home, when he collapses. Eric drives him to A&E where Lucy diagnoses him with carcinomatosis, a terminal cancer. Eric tries to get him and his father, Graham Newcombe (Rod Culbertson), to make peace and Graham says he loved him once. Alfred later dies peacefully with Eric by his side. Father Dominic struggles with his penance.
46	6	"Charity"	Sue Butterworth	Margaret Phelan	13 October 1989
A child has an asthma attack in a caravan. Her father tries to bring her into A&E, but his car breaks down. The ambulance transporting Katie becomes blocked en route so that when she eventually arrives in A&E, she dies in CRASH. An elderly man, Ivor Maitland (Edward Jewesbury), with thrombosis continues to mistreat his wife, Avril Maitland (Kathleen Byron). Lucy treats a woman with an ectopic pregnancy as well as a man who has had a stroke. Since there is a bed shortage, an elderly woman suffering from cancer has to wait in the corridor. Alex is reprimanded by Duffy when she swears at a man who gropes her, although Alex is cheered up when she saves a man who has swallowed a tooth.
47	7	"Victim of Circumstances"	Andrew Morgan	Ginnie Hole	20 October 1989
An Asian school boy, Vijesh Patel (Dinesh Shukia), is beaten up while delivering newspapers. The staff try to persuade his family to call the police but they think the police won't do anything. Vijesh's father, Bharat Patel (Badi Uzzaman), is brought in with multiple injuries after being attacked by four youths in his shop. A 7 year old boy, Sam Langman (William Phillips), is brought in by his teacher. Lucy diagnoses him with appendicitis. He needs a life-saving operation, but they can't get hold of his mother, Carrie Langman (Lia Williams), so she can sign the consent form. Duffy considers an abortion as she worries about life as a single mother. Carrie reassures Duffy and tells her much Sam means to her. Charlie learns that local hospital, Queen's, will be given a new trauma unit rather than Holby.
48	8	"Deluge"	Steve Goldie	Bill Gallagher	27 October 1989
Charlie tackles administrator Valerie Sinclair (Susan Franklyn) about the department's bed shortage. Megan is annoyed when Mrs. Curtis (Gil Brailey), who has just miscarried, spends a whole shift on a corridor. Trudy Cossey (Melissa Wilson) gets drunk at the grand opening of her father, Don Cossey's (Timothy Davies), garden centre after he warns Trudy not to visit her mother. Trudy collapses and has her stomach pumped at the ED. Megan criticises Don when she realises Megan is regularly drunk; Trudy goes into cardiac arrest although the team save her. Bruce Hillage, an asthamtic boy, is boxing with his trainer and father, Don Hillage (Stephen Bent), when he is knocked out, leaving him with a tooth trapped in his lung. While Bruce has an operation to remove the tooth, Don is told by Bruce's mother, Jean Hillage (June Page), that he is not Bruce's biological father as she had an affair before they married. Alex spends her shift travelling with paramedics Josh Griffiths (Ian Bleasdale) and Keith Cotterill (Geoffrey Leesley).
49	9	"Union"	Gerry Harrison	Jacqueline Holborough	3 November 1989
Megan talks to reporters about the suffers the ED are facing, creating front page headlines. She is supported by her colleagues but Valerie warns Megan that she could face a disciplinary hearing. Charlie is at a seminar, leaving Duffy as the nursing lead. Agency nurse Glen Buchanan (Grant Piro) arrives for a shift and catches the eye of Julie. Raqi Darboush (Tope Martins), a 12-year-old Sudanese girl, is admitted to A&E seriously ill after being circumcised by her grandmother (Jeillo Edwards). Raqi's father (Abi Gouhad) is enraged and when Raqi dies, Lucy warns the family that the practice is illegal. Alex becomes upset by Raqi's death so Jimmy comforts her and Duffy reminds her that it is good to become upset sometimes. The surgical consultant observes Lucy demonstrating relaxing techniques on an anxious man, Clive Jolly (Godfrey Jackman), with heart palpitations; the consultant decides Clive is neurotic and warns Lucy that if she wants to succeed, she should not follow these ideas.
50	10	"Taking Stock"	Sue Butterworth	Barry Purchese	10 November 1989
A couple, Dennis Sedgeley (Peter Tilbury) and Joan Sedgeley (Caroline Mortimer), argue as they prepare to auction their bankrupt farm. Joan tells Dennis that their marriage is over; Dennis taunts her and she shoots him. He forgives her, but dies as doctor Mr. Lewis (Christopher Villiers) performs surgery on him in CRASH. Joan is taken away by police. A working mother, Emma Foster (Anna Lindup), who has left her two-year-old son, Ben Foster (Sam Perez), home alone, finds him with an empty aspirin bottle and takes him to A&E. She is hysterical as they give him ipecac to make him sick and give him blood tests, which come back negative. Lucy wishes to keep him in overnight and Emma is worried they'll take him away from her. Jimmy finds a man, Peter Cunningham (Jeremy Bulloch), in the street with severe eye pain, and admits him, although he is reluctant and very agitated. He tells staff he has been mugged, but when Julie tells the police this, it emerges he matches the description of a rapist whose eyes were sprayed by gas.
51	11	"Banking for Beginners"	Jim Hill	Bryan Elsley	24 November 1989
Alex meets with a friend, Jonathan (Peter McCulloch), who offers her a banking job, which would double her pay. She decides to think about it. As she is about to leave, a man collapses on the next table. She resuscitates him and takes him to Queens Hospital, but he dies. After Alex arrives to work late, Duffy snaps although Alex explains her delay. With Charlie away, Duffy is stressed; management have cut their agency budget so they do not have enough staff. An elderly lady, Mrs Calthan (Patricia Hayes), is admitted with a broken hip after falling. Jimmy suspects her daughter, Mary Calthan (Eileen Nicholas), has pushed her downstairs, and tries to warn Lucy, but she dismisses it, believing the old lady is senile. When Mary pushes Mrs Calthan off her cubicle bed, injuring Duffy in the process, Lucy realises that Mary has dementia, not Mrs Calthan. Jimmy becomes annoyed that nobody considers his opinions and tells Alex that he is considering a career in nursing. The full script for the episode can be read on the BBC website.
52	12	"Hanging On"	Steve Goldie	Sam Snape	1 December 1989
A surprise leaving party is thrown for Alex at the end of her shift. However, a bomb explosion in the city centre puts the team on red alert and two surgeons, Arnold Richardson (Julian Glover) and Simon Spencer (Philip Lowrie), are drafted in to assist the team. Two schoolgirls, Janet (Kelly Fennell) and Anna Robson (Melina Michael), are admitted after a school trip to a panto. Janet has minor head injuries, whereas Anna is taken to the operating theatre for a laparotomy; Anna survives the operation. The husband of the schoolgirls' teacher, Peter Marshall (Michael Dyerball), frantically searches for his wife. Cyril discovers a patient is a shoplifer when he notices her bag is full of jewellery. Jimmy waits with bodies; under a sheet, a mobile phone rings; Jimmy answers and tells a worried wife that he will get her husband to call her back.

== Bibliography ==
- Kingsley, Hilary (1995). Casualty: The Inside Story. Penguin Books. ISBN 0-14-024902-8.
