= Russell Boulter =

English actor (born 1963)

- Born: 7 April 1963 (age 63); Liverpool, England
- Occupation: Actor

Russell Boulter (born 7 April 1963) is an English actor and documentary narrator. He is a communications coach.

== Career ==
As a teenager he was one of the original members of the Concrete Theatre Company which toured several theatre productions across the North West of England in pubs, schools and theatres. He played the Kid in Gimme Shelter, Mark in Kennedy's Children, and starred in Sam o Shanker, The Puny Little Life Show, Steve Vortex and the Land Beyond Time, So You Think You're Supposed to Win?, the 1984 Minus 2 Show and The Fosdyke Saga. With Happenstance Theatre Company he played the Doc in Doc Hickory's Spell Binding Adventures.

Boulter trained at London Academy of Music and Dramatic Art (LAMDA), gaining a BA in theatre arts and graduating in 1984 playing the title role in Richard III.

Boulter began his professional career at the Royal Shakespeare Company in January 1985. He stayed with the company for two years starring in six productions. During this time, he played small roles and understudied 40 characters as well as mounting several fringe shows at The Other Place and Almeida Theatre.

His first lead role was as Angel Clare in Tess at Farnham Repertory theatre. He appeared at the Edinburgh Festival several times in the 1980s, eventually producing the ACG venue at St Paul's and St George's which included the UK premier of Maxim Gorky's play Vassa Zheleznova.

In 1990, he worked in the West End playing Mickey in Blood Brothers at the Phoenix and the Albery Theatre. He played the male lead in Noël Coward's Star Quality at the Apollo Theatre and The Madness of George Dubba at the Players' Theatre.

He played the titles roles in Hamlet at The Birmingham Stage Company, 'Pal Joey at the Bristol Old Vic Theatre and Macbeth at the Stafford Festival Theatre. As well as a lead role in Air Guitar at the Bristol Old Vic Studio, Boulter played Michael Brennan in BBC Radio 4's drama series Citizens from October 1987 to July 1989. He has appeared in numerous Radio 4 drama productions. He played Chris, Malcolm's assistant in series four of the Granada Television sitcom Watching from December 1989 to January 1990. He also appeared in three episodes of The Darling Buds of May as the character Roger McGarry, and in five episodes of Heartbeat as Inspector Alistair Crossley during 1993 and 1994.

He played DS John Boulton in ITV's The Bill for five years during which time he set up the production company The 4 Amigos with fellow cast members. His production of Lone Star opened at The Old Red Lion, Islington, north London, and went on to tour Australia and played at the Sydney Opera House. He also produced and starred in a short film called Crush.

Boulter was a regular in Casualty for a year, and appeared in Judge John Deed, EastEnders, Waking the Dead, Mobile and Doctors. He also starred in Murder in Suburbia and Where the Heart Is.

He played Mark in the West End touring production of Art, and directed the play They Came to a City at the Hen and Chickens Theatre in London's fringe.

He has worked extensively as a documentary narrator for the BBC, Channel 4, Channel 5, and the National Geographic and Discovery Channels including the series of Deep Wreck Mysteries on the History Channel, A Short History of Fatherhood on Channel 4 and the Revealed series on Channel 5. He narrated for the BBC Natural History Unit and is the worldwide narrator for Blue Planet 2. He has recorded over 30 titles for BBC Audio Books including The Lives of John Lennon and Charles Dickens' A Christmas Carol.

Boulter presented the documentaries Who is this Jesus? (1999) and Discovering the Bible. He also coaches ordinands during preaching workshops.

Since 2008, he has worked as a communications coach with business people. He designs and runs training courses for corporate level executives which focus on pitching, leadership, and personal impact.

He is a partner at GSB Comms (Garnett, Simpson & Boulter), a global consultancy.

He taught improvisation and acting technique at Bristol Old Vic Theatre School between 2008 and 2010. He qualified as a clinical hypnotherapist in 2009 and is a neuro-linguistic programming (NLP) practitioner.

Recent acting credits include Henry VIII's portrait painter in Starz' The Spanish Princess and a role in Channel 4's The Cure.
