= Julia Watson =

British actress (born 1953)

Julia Watson (born 13 September 1953) is a British actress, known for playing Barbara 'Baz' Wilder in the BBC medical drama Casualty.

== Life and career ==
Watson was born on 13 September 1953 in Derby and brought up in the Derby area. Talking about her parents in an interview with the Casualty fansite, holby.tv, she comments that they were fantastic and devoted. She cites this as reason why she feels so torn between career and family.

She is married to the writer David Harsent; they met at a dinner party and eventually married in a registry office in Fulham. They have a daughter, Hannah, born in 1990.

Watson studied Drama and English at Exeter University. Her previous jobs included founding a Community Centre in Newcastle and working in education at the Nottingham Theatre. In addition to her acting roles, she edited anthologies of poetry and readings for weddings, funerals and naming ceremonies.

== Filmography ==
=== Television ===
Year	Title	Role
1979	Cries from the Watchtower	Nurse
1979	Rings on Their Fingers	The Secretary
1979	Shoestring, "Private Ear"	Girl in DIsco
1979	The Way up to Heaven, S1. Ep 9	Maid
1979-1981	Agony	Lindsay Henderson
1981	Maybury, "Maisie", S.1 Ep.10	Jane
1981–1983	Never the Twain	Lyn Smallbridge
1985	Dempsey and Makepeace	Terry
1986, 1995–1998, 2003–2004	Casualty	Barbara Baz Wilder
1988	Across the Lake	
1988	Bust	
1989	A Touch of Spice	
1989	The Yellow Wallpaper	
1993	Lovejoy	
1999–2000	Welcome to Orty-Fou	
2000	This Is Your Life	Herself
2005, 2010, 2015, 2019, 2023	Doctors	Various roles
2008	A Touch of Frost	Vicar Lucy Daniels
2009	Not Going Out	
2010	Midsomer Murders	Christine Wakely
2024	Doctor Who	Christmas special Guest role - Hilda
2025	Emmerdale	Kathleen

=== Radio ===
- The Comedy of Errors
- Shadow Play (31 May 1999 on BBC Radio 4)

=== Stage ===
- 1980s
  - Major Barbara – played Jenny Hill in a 1982 production at Lyttelton Theatre
  - Danton's Death – played Lady Eugenie in a 1984 production at Olivier Theatre
  - She Stoops to Conquer – played Kate Hardcastle in a 1985 production at National Theatre
  - An Act of Faith – played Helen in a 1985 production at National Theatre Studio
  - John Bull – played in a 1987 production at Bristol Old Vic
  - Love on the Plastic – played in a 1987 production at Half Moon Theatre
- 1990s
  - Six Fools – played in a 1992 production at Old Red Lion Theatre
  - Joking Apart – played Anthea in a 1995 production at Greenwich Theatre
- 2000s
  - Little Women – played Marmee in a 2006 touring production
  - Tosca’s Kiss – played Rebecca West in a 2006 production at Orange Tree Theatre
- 2010s
  - Amy's View – played Esme in a 2010 production at Nottingham Playhouse
  - An Ideal Husband – played Lady Chiltern in a 2010 production at Nottingham Playhouse
  - My Family and Other Animals – played Durrell's mother in a 2011 production at Theatre Royal, York
  - Love's Comedy – played Mrs Halm in a 2012 production at Orange Tree Theatre
  - The Stepmother – played Charlotte Gaydon in a 2013 production at Orange Tree Theatre
  - The Man Who Pays the Piper – played Mrs Fairley in a 2013 production at Orange Tree Theatre
