= Josh Griffiths (Casualty) =

Fictional character from the BBC medical dramas Casualty

- Casualty character
- First appearance: "Chain Reaction"; 8 September 1989
- Last appearance: "Charlie"; 16 March 2024
- Portrayed by: Ian Bleasdale
- Duration: 1989–2007, 2016– 2017, 2024
- Spinoff(s): Casualty@Holby City

In-universe information
- Occupation: Paramedic; Ambulance Duty Officer
- Spouse: Helen Griffiths (until 1997); Collette Kierney (2001–2003)
- Children: Ashley Griffiths (son); Sarah Griffiths (daughter)

Josh Griffiths is a fictional character played by actor Ian Bleasdale from the BBC medical drama Casualty. The character first appears during the fourth season episode, "Chain Reaction", which was broadcast on 8 September 1989. Josh is a paramedic who works for the fictitious "Holby Ambulance Service".

Griffiths became one of the longest-serving characters during his time on the series. Bleasdale decided to leave the show in 2007, and Griffiths departs in the twenty-second series episode "Finding the Words"; first broadcast on 3 November 2007. Bleasdale reprised the role for the show's 30th anniversary, with a feature-length episode in August 2016, and has since returned for an additional four episodes. Bleasdale also reprised the role for Charlie's final episode in 2024

== Creation and casting ==
The character was based on real life paramedic Clive Haddrell, who advised the script writers on the accuracy of the paramedics featured in the show. Actor Ian Bleasdale was initially contracted for a small number of episodes as a guest paramedic. He made his debut as Josh during the fourth series on 8 September 1989. Bleasdale was asked to return for more episodes during the following series, and then for 14 episodes of the sixth series in 1991, before continuing in the role.

== Development ==
=== Departure ===
After appearing in the show for eighteen years and becoming one of the longest serving actors, Bleasdale announced his departure in August 2007. He chose to leave Casualty in order to pursue new acting roles and spend more time with his family. Bleasdale had decided to quit the show two years prior but stayed for his character's storylines. He filmed his final scenes in July. Series producer Oliver Kent stated that the character's exit would allow him to make a return in the future.

Bleasdale wanted Josh to have a happy ending, following a series of bad events in his life. He did not want to act out a death scene. Bleasdale said Josh would find "true happiness" towards the end of his time in the show. Josh met and fell in love with a woman while he was on holiday. He then decided to leave Holby to be with her and shared a "touching farewell" with his friend Charlie Fairhead (Derek Thompson). Josh departed during the episode broadcast on 3 November 2007.

=== Returns ===
On 5 August 2016, it was confirmed that Bleasdale had reprised his role for Casualty's 30th anniversary feature-length episode. Of his return, the actor commented, "My first feeling was of slight apprehension, and the first scene of the first day I had to deal with a technically complex script! The medical advisor, Pete Salt, looked at me and said 'Ian, you know what to do' and I did! Great cast and crew, fantastic director and producer. I felt completely at home again and loved it." Josh returns to Holby to celebrate his friend Charlie's thirty years of service to the NHS. However, he ends up helping out in the ED. The episode aired on 27 August 2016.

Bleasdale reprised the role again in 2017 for a storyline focusing on the wedding of Charlie and Duffy. He made a further appearance in June 2017. Months later, Bleasdale reprised the role for the thirty-second series. His return scenes were teased in the show's Autumn trailer, which caused Elaine Reilly of What's on TV to observe "Josh (Ian Bleasdale) has been no stranger to popping up in Holby as a paramedic manager recently. But to see him feature so prominently in the autumn trailer makes us wonder, is he returning more permanently?"

Bleasdale reprised the role again in 2024 for Charlie's exit storyline.

== Storylines ==
Josh is a paramedic, who in 18 years saved countless lives, risked his own life on many occasions and endured endless personal trauma.

Josh's deepest personal trauma was when a fire ripped through his house in January 1997. His daughter was the only person rescued from the wreckage; his wife Helen and son Ashley (a Cystic fibrosis sufferer) died at the scene, whilst his daughter Sarah later died in hospital afterwards despite frantic attempts of the hospital staff to save her life. Josh returned to work within two weeks of the tragedy, but later developed a gambling and drinking addiction which took two years to overcome.

Josh has since struggled to find love. He married Collette but his marriage collapsed after discovering she was pregnant with a child that had been conceived during an illicit affair. His most recent date proved a disaster as he prepared a meal of duck for a vegetarian and had his overflowing bath fall through the ceiling and collapse on him.

Josh commands a lot of respect from the forever-changing staff of Holby City hospital. The paramedic he had the closest friendship with was Finlay "Fin" Newton (who was murdered). Their friendly banter proved so popular they were granted their own special episode which focused on their shift. Josh nearly died in a landslide in season 15. Prior to this he has been stabbed and strangled, shot at, taken hostage and trapped in quicksand. He has also received a long-service medal from the Queen.

At the end of "Killing Me Softly," (episode 15 from Season 21) Josh was stabbed in the left hand side of his neck in the back of an ambulance. He was still bleeding, and his attacker closed the door on him when the episode ended. The attacker was a woman named Laura Merriman who appeared to be having a mental breakdown and seemed to believe that her child was sick. Josh was tending to a man who had just jumped out of a window on one of the upper floors of the ED when he saw Laura walking away with an unconscious Rosie in a wheelchair. Laura sought shelter in an unlocked ambulance but when Josh entered, she thought that he was trying to take her daughter, Rosie, away from her, so she stabbed him. The ending was a cliffhanger with Josh bleeding heavily. However, in the next part of the story, a badly bleeding Josh was found in the ambulance by Nathan. He shouted for help and Charlie and the rest of the team came out, rushing him straight into resus. Laura is then caught and arrested, and Rosie is saved.

The week after, Josh was seen recovering in another ward of the hospital. Due to recent events, he had become depressed and couldn't see a future for himself. After a heart-to-heart with his longest and best friend Charlie, Josh realized there was so much he wanted to see in the world. After saying his goodbyes to Charlie, Josh left the series at the end of 2006 and set off on his travels to see cricket and culture around the world.

Josh returned in the episode "Aliens", when on a flight returning from Pakistan, a man jumped out of the stationary plane, injuring himself and then jumped in causing a terrorist alert. On his return Josh, decided to step down as duty officer, giving the job to Dixie.

His Indian visitors Devika and Sajini (who was in need of an operation, which Josh paid for) came to visit. When Josh realized his true feelings for Devika, he proposed saying it was for her visa. She refused, thinking that the proposal would be because Josh loved her. Josh caught up with Devika and Sajani at the airport and they left together.

Josh returned for Charlie's 30th anniversary celebrations at the hospital in August 2016. He assisted when an emergency helicopter crashed outside the Emergency Department, and teamed up with both Charlie and Duffy keep the situation under control and to save lives. A few months later Josh returned for Charlie's stag night and subsequent wedding to Duffy.

Josh returned to be by Charlie's bedside after he was stabbed by a patient. Following Charlie's recovery and plan to retire from the health service, he and Josh depart together in a yellow beetle and waved off by Charlie's colleagues.

== Reception ==
Josh was named one of the ten best Casualty characters by a reporter for The Daily Telegraph. They stated, "Everyone needs a Josh in their life. But the beloved paramedic, played by Ian Bleasdale from 1989 until 2007, had terrible luck." Critic Jim Shelley branded Josh the "world's oldest and unluckiest ambulance man".
