= Ian Bleasdale =

British actor (born 1952)

Ian Bleasdale (born 1950, in Upholland, Lancashire) is an English actor and television presenter. He divides his time between Haworth in West Yorkshire and Bristol. He started off life as a teacher before deciding that he wanted to become an actor, something which he would later joke forced his mother to take to her sickbed.

He has appeared in various programmes, including The Beiderbecke Affair, Harry's Game, Brookside, Inspector Morse, The Brittas Empire, Andy Capp, Heartbeat, Soldier Soldier, All Creatures Great and Small, First of the Summer Wine, and as a photographer on Coronation Street.

However, Bleasdale is best known for his role as paramedic Josh Griffiths on the BBC television drama, Casualty.

Josh first appeared in episode 1 of series 4 (1989) and started as a speaking extra. His role has gone from strength to strength over the years and he has had several harrowing storylines so far, including the death of his family in a house fire, and his second wife Collette having an affair with a colleague and finally leaving him. He left the show on 3 November 2007 after 18 years. He returned to the role in 2016, making several guest stints between 2016 and 2017. He later reprised the role in 2024 for Charlie's exit storyline.

He took part in the 2009 series of Celebrity MasterChef. He appeared for a short part in one of the last episodes of The Bill. In 2013 he made appearances in Doctors and Law & Order UK. Since leaving Casualty, Bleasdale has been presenting the BBC1 show Hospital Heroes.
