= List of Casualty episodes (series 1–20) =

The following is a list of the episodes of the British television series Casualty that were broadcast in its first 20 series. Casualty premiered on 6 September 1986 and was originally commissioned for fifteen episodes. The first series concluded on 27 December 1986. Following, its success, a second series was commissioned and Casualty has continued running since.

== Series overview ==
Series	Episodes	Originally released	
Series	Episodes	First released	Last released
1	15	6 September 1986	27 December 1986
2	15	12 September 1987	19 December 1987
3	10	9 September 1988	11 November 1988
4	12	8 September 1989	1 December 1989
5	13	7 September 1990	7 December 1990
6	15	6 September 1991	27 February 1992
7	24	12 September 1992	27 February 1993
8	24	18 September 1993	26 February 1994
9	24	17 September 1994	25 March 1995
10	24	16 September 1995	24 February 1996
11	24	14 September 1996	22 February 1997
12	26	11 September 1997 (Note: The opening episode was originally billed for 6 September 1997, but was deferred due to the funeral of Diana, Princess of Wales. BBC1 showed the film Free Willy in its place.)	28 February 1998
13	28	5 September 1998	13 March 1999
14	30	18 September 1999	25 March 2000
15	36	16 September 2000	28 April 2001
16	40	15 September 2001	29 June 2002
17	40	14 September 2002	21 June 2003
18	46	13 September 2003	28 August 2004
19	48	11 September 2004	20 August 2005
20	48	10 September 2005	26 August 2006
21	48	23 September 2006	4 August 2007
22	48	8 September 2007	9 August 2008
23	48	13 September 2008	1 August 2009
24	48	12 September 2009	21 August 2010
25	47	4 September 2010	6 August 2011
26	42	13 August 2011	22 July 2012
27	44	18 August 2012	26 July 2013
28	48	3 August 2013	23 August 2014
29	46	30 August 2014	23 August 2015
30	43	29 August 2015	30 July 2016
31	45	27 August 2016	29 July 2017
32	44	19 August 2017	4 August 2018
33	46	11 August 2018	10 August 2019
34	43	17 August 2019	26 September 2020
35	30	2 January 2021	7 August 2021
36	44	14 August 2021	13 August 2022
37	43	20 August 2022	19 August 2023
38	36	26 August 2023	3 August 2024
39	34	10 August 2024	12 July 2025
40	20	2 August 2025	18 April 2026
41	TBA	25 April 2026	TBA

== Episodes ==
=== Series 1 (1986) ===
No. overall	No. in series	Title	Directed by	Written by	Original release date
1	1	"Gas"	Frank W. Smith	Jeremy Brock and Paul Unwin	6 September 1986
2	2	"Hide and Seek" (Note: See also "Hide and Seek" series 6)	Frank W. Smith	Paul Unwin and Jeremy Brock	13 September 1986
3	3	"Night Runners"	Antonia Bird	Matthew Bardsley	20 September 1986
4	4	"Jump Start"	Antonia Bird	Susan Wilkins	27 September 1986
5	5	"Blood Brothers"	Antonia Bird	Wally K. Daly	4 October 1986
6	6	"High Noon"	Frank W. Smith	Ray Brennan	11 October 1986
7	7	"Professionals"	Frank W. Smith	Susan Wilkins	18 October 1986
8	8	"Crazies"	Renny Rye	Matthew Bardsley	25 October 1986
9	9	"Moonlight Becomes You..."	Renny Rye	Ray Brennan	8 November 1986
10	10	"Teeny Poppers"	Renny Rye	Janey Preger	15 November 1986
11	11	"Drunk"	Jan Sargent	Lise Mayer	22 November 1986
12	12	"Quiet"	Michael Brayshaw	Roy Mitchell	6 December 1986
13	13	"No Future"	Jan Sargent	Paul Unwin and Jeremy Brock	13 December 1986
14	14	"Survival"	Michael Brayshaw	Wally K Daly	20 December 1986
15	15	"Closure"	Jan Sargent	Jeremy Brock and Paul Unwin	27 December 1986

=== Series 2 (1987) ===
No. overall	No. in series	Title	Directed by	Written by	Original release date
16	1	"A Little Lobbying"	Antonia Bird	Jeremy Brock and Paul Unwin	12 September 1987
17	2	"A Drop of the Hard Stuff"	Antonia Bird	Roy Mitchell	19 September 1987
18	3	"Shades of Love"	Michael Brayshaw	Wally K Daly	26 September 1987
19	4	"Cry for Help"	Alan Wareing	Paul Unwin and Jeremy Brock	3 October 1987
20	5	"Anaconda"	Michael Brayshaw	Ray Brennan	10 October 1987
21	6	"Lifelines"	Sharon Miller	Jeremy Brock	17 October 1987
22	7	"The Raid"	Sharon Miller	Susan Wilkins	24 October 1987
23	8	"Cross Fingers"	Alan Wareing	David Ashton	31 October 1987
24	9	"Seeking Heat"	Christopher Menaul	Ray Brennan and Jeremy Brock	7 November 1987
25	10	"Rock-a-Bye Baby"	Sharon Miller	Ginnie Hole	14 November 1987
26	11	"Hooked"	Michael Brayshaw	Billy Hamon	21 November 1987
27	12	"Fun Night"	Alan Wareing	Al Hunter Ashton	28 November 1987
28	13	"Peace, Brother"	Michael Brayshaw	David Ashton	5 December 1987
29	14	"Burning Cases"	Christopher Menaul	Jeremy Brock and Paul Unwin	12 December 1987
30	15	"These Things Happen"	Alan Wareing	David Ashton	19 December 1987

=== Series 3 (1988) ===
No. overall	No. in series	Title	Directed by	Written by	Original release date
31	1	"Welcome to Casualty"	Michael Owen Morris	David Ashton	9 September 1988
32	2	"Desperate Odds"	Graham Theakston	Ginnie Hole	16 September 1988
33	3	"Drake's Drum"	Keith Washington	Keith Dewhurst	23 September 1988
34	4	"Absolution"	Jeremy Silberston	Wally K Daly	30 September 1988
35	5	"Burn Out"	Michael Owen Morris	Jeremy Brock	7 October 1988
36	6	"A Quiet Night"	Graham Theakston	David Ashton	14 October 1988
37	7	"A Wing and a Prayer"	Keith Washington	Ginnie Hole	5 August 1989
38	8	"Living Memories"	Keith Washington	Ginnie Hole	21 October 1988
39	9	"Inferno"	Tim Dowd	Jeremy Brock	28 October 1988
40	10	"Caring"	Michael Owen Morris	Ginnie Hole	4 November 1988

=== Series 4 (1989) ===
No. overall	No. in series	Title	Directed by	Written by	Original release date
41	1	"Chain Reaction" (Note: See also "Chain Reactions" series 11 & "Chain Reaction" series 30)	Andrew Morgan	Ginnie Hole	8 September 1989
42	2	"Accidents Happen"	Jeremy Silberston	Bill Gallagher	15 September 1989
43	3	"A Grand in the Hand"	Sue Butterworth	Sam Snape	22 September 1989
44	4	"Day Off"	Steve Goldie	Jacqueline Holborough	29 September 1989
45	5	"Vital Spark"	Terry Iland	John Fletcher	6 October 1989
46	6	"Charity"	Sue Butterworth	Margaret Phelan	13 October 1989
47	7	"Victim of Circumstances"	Andrew Morgan	Ginnie Hole	20 October 1989
48	8	"Deluge"	Steve Goldie	Bill Gallagher	27 October 1989
49	9	"Union"	Gerry Harrison	Jacqueline Holborough	3 November 1989
50	10	"Taking Stock"	Sue Butterworth	Barry Purchese	10 November 1989
51	11	"Banking for Beginners"	Jim Hill	Bryan Elsley	24 November 1989
52	12	"Hanging On"	Steve Goldie	Sam Snape	1 December 1989

=== Series 5 (1990) ===
No. overall	No. in series	Title	Directed by	Written by	Original release date
53	1	"Penalty"	Michael Owen Morris	Ginnie Hole	7 September 1990
54	2	"Results"	Andrew Morgan	Ben Aaronovitch	14 September 1990
55	3	"Close to Home"	Alan Wareing	Jim Hill	21 September 1990
56	4	"Street Life"	Jim Hill	Ian Briggs	28 September 1990
57	5	"Hiding Place"	Jim Hill	Tony Etchells	5 October 1990
58	6	"Salvation"	Michael Owen Morris	Robin Mukherjee	12 October 1990
59	7	"Say it With Flowers"	Alan Wareing	Rona Munro	19 October 1990
60	8	"Love's a Pain"	Andrew Morgan	Sam Snape	26 October 1990
61	9	"A Will to Die"	Michael Brayshaw	Christopher Penfold	2 November 1990
62	10	"Big Boys Don't Cry" (Note: See also "Boys Don’t Cry" series 19)	Jenny Killick	Ginnie Hole	9 November 1990
63	11	"Remembrance"	Michael Owen Morris	Robin Mukherjee	16 November 1990
64	12	"All's Fair" (Note: See also "All's Fair" series 10, "All's Fair" series 16 & "All's Fair in Love and War" series 20)	Alan Wareing	Stephen Wyatt	30 November 1990
65	13	"A Reasonable Man"	Andrew Morgan	Barbara Machin	7 December 1990

=== Series 6 (1991–1992) ===
No. overall	No. in series	Title	Directed by	Written by	Original release date	UK viewers (millions)
66	1	"Humpty Dumpty"	Jim Hill	Ginnie Hole	6 September 1991	>12.0
67	2	"Judgement Day" (Note: See also "Judgement Day" series 17)	Margy Kinmonth	Barbara Machin	13 September 1991	—
68	3	"Dangerous Games" (Note: See also "Dangerous Games" series 19)	Charles McDougall	Robin Mukherjee	20 September 1991	13.08
69	4	"Hide and Seek" (Note: See also "Hide and Seek" series 1)	Jim Hill	David Richard-Fox	27 September 1991	13.65
70	5	"Joy Ride"	Steve Goldie	Bill Gallagher	4 October 1991	—
71	6	"Something to Hide"	Steve Goldie	Stephen Wyatt	11 October 1991	—
72	7	"Beggars Can't Be Choosers"	Alan Wareing	Ginnie Hole	18 October 1991	—
73	8	"Living in Hope"	Margy Kinmonth	Robin Mukherjee	25 October 1991	—
74	9	"Making the Break"	Jim Hill	Jacqueline Holborough	1 November 1991	15.33
75	10	"Sins of Omission"	Alan Wareing	Bryan Elsley	8 November 1991	15.68
76	11	"The Last Word"	Michael Owen Morris	Barbara Machin	15 November 1991	15.96
77	12	"Pressure! What Pressure?"	Michael Brayshaw	Arthur McKenzie	29 November 1991	16.06
78	13	"Facing Up" (Note: See also "Facing Up" series 12, "Facing Up" series 19 & "Face Up" series 23)	Bill Pryde	Bill Gallagher	6 December 1991	15.17
79	14	"Allegiance"	Alan Wareing	David Richard-Fox	13 December 1991	15.48
80	15	"Cascade"	Michael Owen Morris	Ginnie Hole	27 February 1992	—

=== Series 7 (1992–1993) ===
No. overall	No. in series	Title	Directed by	Written by	Original release date	UK viewers (millions)
81	1	"Rates of Exchange"	Alan Wareing	Barbara Machin	12 September 1992	—
82	2	"Cry Wolf"	Michael Owen Morris	David Richard-Fox	19 September 1992	—
83	3	"Body Politic"	Michael Owen Morris	Ginnie Hole	26 September 1992	—
84	4	"Will You Still Love Me?"	Bill Pryde	Helen Greaves	3 October 1992	—
85	5	"Cherish"	Alan Wareing	Catherine Johnson	10 October 1992	—
86	6	"Profit and Loss"	Michael Brayshaw	Stephen Wyatt	17 October 1992	—
87	7	"One Step Forward"	Michael Brayshaw	Peter Bowker	24 October 1992	—
88	8	"Body and Soul"	Bill Pryde	Peter Bowker	31 October 1992	—
89	9	"Tender Loving Care"	Alan Wareing	Barbara Machin	7 November 1992	—
90	10	"Money Talks"	Michael Owen Morris	Bryan Elsley	14 November 1992	16.21
91	11	"Making Waves"	Michael Brayshaw	Robin Mukherjee	21 November 1992	16.10
92	12	"If It Isn't Hurting"	Bill Pryde	Jacqueline Holborough	28 November 1992	—
93	13	"Act of Faith"	Alan Wareing	Catherine Johnson	5 December 1992	16.64
94	14	"Point of Principle"	Michael Owen Morris	Peter Bowker	19 December 1992	—
95	15	"Silent Night" (Note: See also "Silent Night" series 21)	Michael Brayshaw	Ginnie Hole	24 December 1992	—
96	16	"The Ties That Bind" (Note: See also "The Ties That Bind" series 13, "The Ties That Bind" series 17, "The Ties That Bind" series 26 & "The Ties That Bind Us" series 19)	Michael Brayshaw	Stephen Wyatt	2 January 1993	—
97	17	"Life in the Fast Lane"	Tom Cotter	Susan Wilkins	9 January 1993	—
98	18	"Everybody Needs Somebody"	Michael Owen Morris	Arthur Mckenzie	16 January 1993	—
99	19	"Getting Involved"	Marcus D.F. White	Sam Snape	23 January 1993	—
100	20	"Dividing Loyalties"	Alan Wareing	Robin Mukherjee	30 January 1993	—
101	21	"Family Matters" (Note: See also "Family Matters" series 20 & "Family Matters" series 27)	Tom Cotter	Robin Mukherjee	6 February 1993	—
102	22	"Child's Play"	Marcus D.F. White	Jacqueline Holborough	13 February 1993	—
103	23	"No Cause for Concern"	Alan Wareing	Bryan Elsley	20 February 1993	—
104	24	"Boiling Point"	Michael Owen Morris	Peter Bowker	27 February 1993	17.02

=== Series 8 (1993–1994) ===
No. overall	No. in series	Title	Directed by	Written by	Original release date	UK viewers (millions)
105	1	"Cat in Hell"	Charles Beeson	Ginnie Hole	18 September 1993	13.96
106	2	"Riders on the Storm"	Matthew Evans	Susan Wilkins	25 September 1993	14.17
107	3	"The Final Word"	Matthew Evans	Peter Bowker	2 October 1993	14.48
108	4	"No Place to Hide"	George Case	Scott Cherry	9 October 1993	15.12
109	5	"Sunday, Bloody Sunday"	Richard Bramall	Andrew Holden	16 October 1993	15.31
110	6	"Good Friends"	Laura Sims	Stephen Wyatt	23 October 1993	15.75
111	7	"Kill or Cure"	Laura Sims	Greg Snow	30 October 1993	16.07
112	8	"Born Losers"	George Case	(no writer credited)	6 November 1993	—
113	9	"High Rollers"	Charles Beeson	Sam Snape	13 November 1993	15.90
114	10	"Deceptions"	Paul Harrison	Neil McKay	20 November 1993	—
115	11	"Give Us This Day"	Philip Casson	David Richard-Fox	27 November 1993	15.85
116	12	"Wild Card"	Richard Bramall	(no writer credited)	4 December 1993	16.32
117	13	"The Good Life"	Diana Patrick	Susan Wilkins	11 December 1993	16.61
118	14	"Out To Lunch"	Charles Beeson	Sam Snape	18 December 1993	16.06
119	15	"Comfort and Joy" (Note: See also "Tidings of Comfort and Joy" series 24)	Richard Bramall	Barbara Machin	26 December 1993	17.03
120	16	"Family Ties"	John Darnell	Neil McKay	1 January 1994	14.92
121	17	"United We Fall"	Richard Bramall	Andrew Holden	8 January 1994	—
122	18	"Tippers"	Philip Casson	Nick McCarty	15 January 1994	—
123	19	"Value for Money"	Diana Patrick	Allan Swift	22 January 1994	—
124	20	"Care in the Community"	Matthew Evans	Andrew Holden	29 January 1994	—
125	21	"Signed, Sealed, Delivered"	John Darnell	David Richard-Fox	5 February 1994	—
126	22	"Relations"	Philip Casson	Nick McCarty	12 February 1994	—
127	23	"Grand Rational"	Paul Harrison	Sam Snape	19 February 1994	—
128	24	"Hidden Agendas"	Matthew Evans	Andrew Holden	26 February 1994	—

=== Series 9 (1994–1995) ===
No. overall	No. in series	Title	Directed by	Written by	Original release date	UK viewers (millions)
129	1	"Blood's Thicker" (Note: See also "Blood Is Thicker Than Water" series 28)	Henry Foster	Sam Snape	17 September 1994	18.45
130	2	"First Impressions" (Note: See also "First Impressions" series 18, "First Impressions" series 20 & "First Impressions" series 28)	Sallie Aprahamian	Lisa Evans	24 September 1994	19.01
131	3	"Keeping it in the Family" (Note: See also "Keep It In the Family" series 17)	David Innes Edwards	Keith Temple	1 October 1994	—
132	4	"Chasing the Dragon"	Chris Clough	Rob Gittins	8 October 1994	—
133	5	"Love and Affection"	Sue Dunderdale	Billy Hamon	15 October 1994	—
134	6	"Negative Equity"	Geoff Feld	Andrew Holden	22 October 1994	15.89
135	7	"A Breed Apart"	Chris Lovett	David Joss Buckley	29 October 1994	15.74
136	8	"In the Black"	David Innes Edwards	Peter Bowker	5 November 1994	17.10
137	9	"Crossing the Line" (Note: See also "Crossing the Line" series 20)	Catherine Morshead	Ashley Pharoah	12 November 1994	—
138	10	"Only the Lonely" (Note: See also "Only the Lonely" series 16, "Only the Lonely" series 25 & "Only the Lonely" series 28)	Robert Gabriel	Ashley Pharoah	19 November 1994	17.24
139	11	"The Facts of Life"	Robert Gabriel	Andrew Holden	10 December 1994	—
140	12	"Under the Weather"	Ian White	Lisa Evans	17 December 1994	—
141	13	"Talking Turkey"	Sallie Aprahamian	Lilie Ferrari	24 December 1994	—
142	14	"End of the Road"	David Innes Edwards	Keith Temple	14 January 1995	—
143	15	"Learning Curve"	Pip Broughton	Tony McHale	21 January 1995	—
144	16	"Stitching the Surface"	Jane Perry	Gillian Richmond	28 January 1995	—
145	17	"Heartbreak Hotel"	Chris Clough	Rob Gittins	4 February 1995	—
146	18	"Trial and Tribulations"	Ian White	Lilie Ferrari	11 February 1995	—
147	19	"Out of Time"	Chris Lovett	David Joss Buckley	18 February 1995	—
148	20	"Branded"	Diana Patrick	Billy Hamon	25 February 1995	—
149	21	"Exiles"	Tony McHale	Tony McHale	4 March 1995	—
150	22	"Nobody's Perfect" (Note: See also "Nobody's Perfect" series 16 & "Nobody's Perfect" series 20)	Geoff Feld	Lisa Evans	11 March 1995	—
151	23	"Not Waving But Drowning" (Note: See also "Not Waving But Drowning" series 14 & "Waving Not Drowning" series 16)	Michael Owen Morris	Ashley Pharoah	18 March 1995	—
152	24	"Duty of Care" (Note: See also "Duty of Care" series 25 & "Duty of Care" series 26)	David Innes Edwards	Andrew Holden	25 March 1995	16.75

=== Series 10 (1995–1996) ===
No. overall	No. in series	Title	Directed by	Written by	Original release date	UK viewers (millions)
153	1	"Family Values"	Chris Lovett	Lisa Evans	16 September 1995	—
154	2	"Money for Nothing"	Catherine Morshead	Rob Gittins	23 September 1995	—
155	3	"Sacrifice"	Matthew Evans	Keith Temple	30 September 1995	—
156	4	"Outside Bulwayo"	Robert Gabriel	Ashley Pharoah	7 October 1995	—
157	5	"Halfway House"	Ian White	David Joss Buckley	14 October 1995	—
158	6	"Compensation"	Ken Horn	Joanne Maguire	21 October 1995	—
159	7	"Turning Point"	Tony McHale	Tony McHale	28 October 1995	—
160	8	"Battling On"	Geoff Feld	Ann Marie Di Mambro	4 November 1995	—
161	9	"Hit and Run"	Rob Evans	Billy Hamon	11 November 1995	—
162	10	"When All Else Fails"	David Innes Edwards	Tom Needham	18 November 1995	—
163	11	"Release"	Indra Bhose	David Richard-Fox	25 November 1995	—
164	12	"Bringing It All Back Home"	Michael Owen Morris	Rob Gittins	2 December 1995	—
165	13	"All's Fair" (Note: See also "All's Fair" series 5, "All's Fair" series 16 & "All's Fair in Love and War" series 20)	Sharon Miller	Keith Temple	9 December 1995	—
166	14	"Shame the Devil"	Rob Evans	David Joss Buckley	16 December 1995	—
167	15	"Lost Boys"	Robert Gabriel	Ashley Pharoah	23 December 1995	—
168	16	"Castles in the Air"	Laurence Moody	Andrew Holden	30 December 1995	—
169	17	"We Shall Overcome"	Ken Horn	Christopher Reason	6 January 1996	—
170	18	"Land of Hope"	Ken Horn	Billy Hamon	13 January 1996	—
171	19	"For Your Own Good"	Rob Evans	Lisa Evans	20 January 1996	—
172	20	"Asking for Miracles"	Roger Gartland	Joanne Maguire	27 January 1996	—
173	21	"Subject to Contract"	Catherine Morshead	Gillian Richmond	3 February 1996	—
174	22	"Cheatin' Hearts"	Chris Lovett	Rob Gittins	10 February 1996	—
175	23	"That Way Lies Ruin"	Diana Patrick	Keith Temple	17 February 1996	—
176	24	"Night Moves"	David Innes Edwards	David Joss Buckley	24 February 1996	18.05

=== Series 11 (1996–1997) ===
No. overall	No. in series	Title	Directed by	Written by	Original release date	UK viewers (millions)
177	1	"Chain Reactions" (Note: See also "Chain Reaction" series 4 & "Chain Reaction" series 30)	Roger Gartland	Andrew Holden	14 September 1996	21.04
178	2	"Relative Values"	Graeme Harper	Chris Lang	21 September 1996	19.88
179	3	"It Ain't Me, Babe"	Michael Owen Morris	Rob Gittins	28 September 1996	—
180	4	"Thicker Than Water" (Note: See also "Thicker Than Water" series 17)	David Penn	Kate Lock	5 October 1996	19.76
181	5	"Waterwings"	Laurence Moody	Simon Stirling	12 October 1996	—
182	6	"Still Waters"	Robert Gabriel	Manjit Singh	19 October 1996	—
183	7	"Nightfall"	Sallie Aprahamian	Simon Ashdown	26 October 1996	16.97
184	8	"Vital Signs"	Tim Prager	Barbara Machin	2 November 1996	16.78
185	9	"Another Day in Paradise"	Tony McHale	Tony McHale	9 November 1996	18.34
186	10	"Flesh and Blood"	John Bruce	Lilie Ferrari	16 November 1996	17.79
187	11	"Made in Britain"	Romey Allison	Lisa Evans	23 November 1996	—
188	12	"Mother's Little Helper"	Ian White	Peter Mills	30 November 1996	—
189	13	"Trapped"	Alan Bell	Andrew Holden	7 December 1996	20.13
190	14	"Do You Believe in Fairies?"	Johnathan Young	Deborah Cook	14 December 1996	—
191	15	"The Dying of the Light"	Indra Bhose	Christopher Reason	21 December 1996	—
192	16	"The Homecoming"	Tim Prager	Chris Lang	28 December 1996	—
193	17	"Hidden Depths"	Beryl Richards	Simon Stirling	4 January 1997	18.90
194	18	"Tall Tales"	Robin Shepperd	David Joss Buckley	11 January 1997	—
195	19	"Déjà Vu" (Note: See also "Déjà Vu" series 17)	Tim O'Mara	Lilie Ferrari	18 January 1997	—
196	20	"Treasure"	Ken Hannam	Lisa Evans	25 January 1997	—
197	21	"United... By Blood"	Tony McHale	Tony McHale	1 February 1997	—
198	22	"Make Believe"	Peter Barber-Fleming	Kate Lock	8 February 1997	17.23
199	23	"Monday, Bloody Monday"	Graeme Harper	Barbara Machin	15 February 1997	15.98
200	24	"Perfect Blue"	Graeme Harper	Barbara Machin	22 February 1997	16.42

=== Series 12 (1997–1998) ===
No. overall	No. in series	Title	Directed by	Written by	Original release date	UK viewers (millions)
201	1	"Give My Love to Esme"	Peter Barber-Fleming	Ginnie Hole	11 September 1997	20.65
202	2	"Private Lives"	Peter Barber-Fleming	Robin Mukherjee	13 September 1997	20.32
203	3	"Nearest and Dearest"	Martin Hutchings	Stephen Wyatt	20 September 1997	17.93
204	4	"What Friends Are For"	Hettie MacDonald	Andrew Holden	27 September 1997	—
205	5	"The Things We Do For Love"	Michael Owen Morris	Peter Bowker	4 October 1997	—
206	6	"Counting the Cost"	Nigel Douglas	Tony McHale	11 October 1997	19.00
207	7	"Always on My Mind"	Anthony Garner	Shelagh Stephenson	18 October 1997	16.89
208	8	"Finders Keepers"	Martin Hutchings	Joe Broughton	25 October 1997	17.06
209	9	"Whatever it Takes"	Hettie MacDonald	Tony Lindsay	1 November 1997	15.99
210	10	"A Taste of Freedom"	Nigel Douglas	Shelagh Stephenson	8 November 1997	17.22
211	11	"Bad Company"	Michael Owen Morris	Robin Mukherjee	15 November 1997	—
212	12	"Moving On"	Alan Wareing	Jonathan Rich	22 November 1997	18.15
213	13	"Power of Persuasion"	Anthony Garner	Tony Lindsay	29 November 1997	—
214	14	"Out of Control"	Gary Love	Carolyn Sally Jones	6 December 1997	—
215	15	"Love's Labour"	Joanna Hogg	Gil Brailey	13 December 1997	—
216	16	"Facing Up" (Note: See also "Facing Up" series 6, "Facing Up" series 19 & "Face Up" series 23)	Michael Owen Morris	Jonathan Rich	20 December 1997	—
217	17	"The Golden Hour"	Nigel Douglas	Barbara Machin	27 December 1997	21.20
218	18	"An Eye for an Eye"	Alan Wareing	Tony Lindsay	3 January 1998	—
219	19	"Loco Parentis"	Gwennan Sage	Andrew Holden	10 January 1998	—
220	20	"Degrees of Separation"	Joanna Hogg	Gil Brailey	17 January 1998	16.88
221	21	"Secrets"	Michael Owen Morris	Jonathan Rich	24 January 1998	—
222	22	"Love Me Tender"	Gary Love	Tony Lindsay	31 January 1998	—
223	23	"Taking Sides"	Paul Murton	Steve Chambers	7 February 1998	—
224	24	"We Can Be Heroes"	Michael Owen Morris	Jonathan Rich	14 February 1998	16.24
225	25	"Everlasting Love – Part One"	Nigel Douglas	Barbara Machin	21 February 1998	17.01
226	26	"Everlasting Love – Part Two"	Nigel Douglas	Barbara Machin	28 February 1998	15.74

=== Series 13 (1998–1999) ===
No. overall	No. in series	Title	Directed by	Written by	Original release date	UK viewers (millions)
227	1	"Internal Inferno – Part One"	Nigel Douglas	Tony McHale	5 September 1998	11.23
228	2	"Internal Inferno – Part Two"	Nigel Douglas	Tony McHale	6 September 1998	10.37
229	3	"Honey Bunny"	Paul Wroblewski	Jeff Povey	12 September 1998	9.82
230	4	"The Ties That Bind" (Note: See also "The Ties That Bind" series 7, "The Ties That Bind" series 17, "The Ties That Bind" series 26 & "The Ties That Bind Us" series 19)	Michael Owen Morris	Andrew Rattenbury	19 September 1998	11.46
231	5	"Toys and Boys"	Julian Holmes	Tony Basgallop	26 September 1998	12.58
232	6	"Eye Spy"	Gary Love	Andrew Rattenbury	3 October 1998	12.16
233	7	"A Place of Safety"	Gill Wilkinson	Susan Boyd	10 October 1998	11.42
234	8	"She Loved the Rain"	Tim Leandro	Simon Mirren	17 October 1998	12.56
235	9	"Public Service"	Steve Shill	Gillian Richmond	24 October 1998	12.74
236	10	"It's Good to Talk"	Roberto Bangura	Deborah Cook	31 October 1998	11.92
237	11	"Next of Kin"	Michael Owen Morris	Patrick Wilde	7 November 1998	11.04
238	12	"Home Truths"	Paul Wroblewski	Graham Mitchell	14 November 1998	11.70
239	13	"One from the Heart"	Alan Wareing	Barbara Machin	21 November 1998	12.71
240	14	"Trust"	Claire Winyard	Chris Murray	28 November 1998	12.66
241	15	"No Place Like Home"	Gill Wilkinson	Susan Boyd	5 December 1998	12.65
242	16	"Making a Difference"	Alan Wareing	Andrew Rattenbury	12 December 1998	12.31
243	17	"Miracle on Casualty"	Michael Owen Morris	Tony McHale	19 December 1998	12.62
244	18	"New Year and All That"	Paul Wroblewski	Tony McHale	26 December 1998	12.08
245	19	"Trapped"	Claire Winyard	Tony McHale	9 January 1999	9.60
246	20	"White Lies, White Wedding"	Robert Bailey	Jeff Povey	16 January 1999	11.84
247	21	"Team Work"	Michael Owen Morris	Patrick Wilde	23 January 1999	12.10
248	22	"Human Traffic"	Philippa Langdale	Jeff Povey	30 January 1999	11.49
249	23	"Mother's Day"	Julian Holmes	Christopher Reason	6 February 1999	12.09
250	24	"Face Value"	Nigel Douglas	Graham Mitchell	13 February 1999	13.09
251	25	"Crazy Love"	Roberto Bangura	Susan Boyd	20 February 1999	12.61
252	26	"The Hardest Word"	Gill Wilkinson	Christopher Reason	27 February 1999	12.84
253	27	"Love Over Gold – Part One"	Gary Love	Chris Murray	6 March 1999	10.04
254	28	"Love Over Gold – Part Two"	Gary Love	Andrew Rattenbury	13 March 1999	9.65

=== Series 14 (1999–2000) ===
No. overall	No. in series	Title	Directed by	Written by	Original release date	UK viewers (millions)
255	1	"Calm Before the Storm – Part One"	Paul Wroblewski	Simon Mirren	18 September 1999	11.90
256	2	"Calm Before the Storm – Part Two"	Paul Wroblewski	Simon Mirren	19 September 1999	12.37
257	3	"Truth or Dare"	Julian Holmes	Tony McHale	25 September 1999	11.47
258	4	"Words and Deeds"	Roberto Bangura	Ben Cooper	2 October 1999	11.28
259	5	"Crossroads"	Gill Wilkinson	Tony McHale	9 October 1999	11.09
260	6	"Lost Souls"	Gill Wilkinson	Andrew Rattenbury	16 October 1999	11.23
261	7	"Everybody Hurts"	Robert Del Maestro	Katharine Way	23 October 1999	10.81
262	8	"Seeing the Light"	Alan Wareing	Katharine Way	30 October 1999	9.12
263	9	"Off the Wall"	Paul Wroblewski	Len Collin	6 November 1999	8.52
264	10	"Benny and the Vets – Part One"	Julian Holmes	Chris Murray	13 November 1999	8.62
265	11	"Benny and the Vets – Part Two"	Julian Holmes	Chris Murray	14 November 1999	10.14
266	12	"Sins of the Mother"	Gill Wilkinson	Jeff Povey	20 November 1999	11.72
267	13	"Looking After Number One"	Roberto Bangura	Nick Saltrese	27 November 1999	12.42
268	14	"To Have and to Hold"	Dominic Lees	Sam Wheats	4 December 1999	10.37
269	15	"Free Fall"	Michael Owen Morris	Andrew Rattenbury	11 December 1999	10.83
270	16	"Just a Kiss"	Alan Wareing	Graham Mitchell	18 December 1999	11.23
271	17	"Peace on Earth"	Gill Wilkinson	Tony McHale	26 December 1999	9.16
272	18	"The Morning After"	Tim Leandro	Christopher Reason	1 January 2000	11.96
273	19	"Untouchable"	Alan Wareing	Katharine Way	9 January 2000	10.96
274	20	"Fall Out"	Ged Maguire	Ben Cooper	15 January 2000	12.14
275	21	"Full On"	Ashley Pearce	Jeff Povey	22 January 2000	9.45
276	22	"Mirror Image"	Robert Del Maestro	Sam Wheats	29 January 2000	11.99
277	23	"Burned Out Hearts"	Tim Leandro	Susan Boyd	5 February 2000	11.74
278	24	"Tough Love"	Dominic Lees	Simon Moss	12 February 2000	12.34
279	25	"Not Waving But Drowning" (Note: See also "Not Waving But Drowning" series 9 & "Waving Not Drowning" series 16)	Ashley Pearce	Andrew Rattenbury	19 February 2000	11.36
280	26	"Seize the Night"	Gary Love	Simon Mirren	26 February 2000	11.76
281	27	"Life Support"	Julie Edwards	Barnaby Marshall	4 March 2000	11.56
282	28	"Blood Brothers"	Tim Leandro	Graham Mitchell	11 March 2000	11.44
283	29	"Being There – Part One"	Robert Del Maestro (UK); Ashley Pearce (AU)	Katharine Way	18 March 2000	11.17
284	30	"Being There – Part Two"	Robert Del Maestro (UK); Ashley Pearce (AU)	Katharine Way	25 March 2000	11.72

=== Series 15 (2000–2001) ===
No. overall	No. in series	Title	Directed by	Written by	Original release date	UK viewers (millions)
285	1	"Phoenix"	Tim Leandro	Ben Cooper	16 September 2000	9.86
286	2	"Accidents Happen"	Dominic Lees	Jeff Povey	23 September 2000	9.24
287	3	"Getting to Know You"	Ged Maguire	Simon Moss	30 September 2000	9.48
288	4	"Too Tight to Mention"	Gill Wilkinson	Suzie Smith	7 October 2000	9.89
289	5	"Choked – Part One"	Robert Del Maestro	Katharine Way	14 October 2000	9.97
290	6	"Choked – Part Two"	Robert Del Maestro	Katharine Way	15 October 2000	9.30
291	7	"Travelling Light"	Michael Owen Morris	Matthew Leys	21 October 2000	9.01
292	8	"Sympathy for the Devil"	Michael Owen Morris	Len Collin	22 October 2000	7.40
293	9	"No More Mr. Nice Guy"	Adrian Bean	Chris Jury	28 October 2000	8.77
294	10	"States of Shock"	Albert Barber	Susan Boyd	4 November 2000	8.35
295	11	"Marking Time"	Patrick Tucker	Len Collin	11 November 2000	8.91
296	12	"Starting Over"	Graham Moore	Kathrine Smith	18 November 2000	8.92
297	13	"If You Go Down to the Wards Today"	Kate Cheeseman	Jeff Povey	25 November 2000	8.91
298	14	"Coming Clean"	Julie Edwards	Patrick Melanaphy	2 December 2000	8.21
299	15	"Chinese Whispers"	Alan Wareing	Clive Dawson	9 December 2000	9.41
300	16	"A Turn of the Scrooge"	Simon Meyers	Simon Moss	16 December 2000	9.90
301	17	"Merry Christmas Dr. Spiller"	Michael Owen Morris	Jeff Povey	23 December 2000	9.77
302	18	"Epiphany"	Dominic Lees	Suzie Smith	30 December 2000	10.40
303	19	"On the Edge"	Kate Cheeseman	Carolyn Sally Jones	6 January 2001	9.63
304	20	"Girl Power"	N.G. Bristow	Matthew Leys	13 January 2001	10.02
305	21	"Heart of Gold"	Albert Barber	Ben Cooper	20 January 2001	9.09
306	22	"Better Safe Than Sorry"	Tim Holloway	Chris Jury	27 January 2001	9.13
307	23	"Something from the Heart"	Paul Duane	Graham Mitchell	2 February 2001	7.82
308	24	"Big Mistake"	Brett Fallis	Patrick Melanaphy	3 February 2001	9.14
309	25	"Ambulance Chaser"	Ged Maguire	Len Collin	10 February 2001	9.37
310	26	"Scent of the Roses"	Julie Edwards	Susan Boyd	17 February 2001	9.03
311	27	"Breaking Point"	Tim Leandro	Isabelle Grey	24 February 2001	8.92
312	28	"Lost and Found"	Nic Phillips	Simon Moss	3 March 2001	9.25
313	29	"Kindness of Strangers"	N.G. Bristow	Suzie Smith	10 March 2001	9.52
314	30	"Only You"	Graham Moore	Chris Ould	17 March 2001	9.39
315	31	"Allied Forces"	Patrick Tucker	Kathrine Smith	24 March 2001	8.82
316	32	"Heroes and Villains"	Paul Duane	Carolyn Sally Jones	31 March 2001	8.38
317	33	"The Long Road Home"	Alan Wareing	Jeff Povey	7 April 2001	8.85
318	34	"Mix and Match"	Paul Murton	Chris Webb	14 April 2001	8.64
319	35	"Breaking the Spell – Part One"	Tim Leandro	Katharine Way	21 April 2001	8.24
320	36	"Breaking the Spell – Part Two"	Tim Leandro	Katharine Way	28 April 2001	9.95

=== Series 16 (2001–2002) ===
No. overall	No. in series	Title	Directed by	Written by	Original release date	UK viewers (millions)
321	1	"Holding the Baby"	Adrian Bean	Stephen McAteer	15 September 2001	8.98
322	2	"Dirty Laundry"	Paul Duane	Clive Dawson and Stephen McAteer	22 September 2001	8.41
323	3	"All's Fair" (Note: See also "All's Fair" series 5, "All's Fair" series 10 & "All's Fair in Love and War" series 20)	Paul Wroblewski	David Lane	29 September 2001	8.29
324	4	"Crash Course"	Tim Leandro	Paul Cornell	6 October 2001	8.48
325	5	"Bringing Up Baby"	Sue Dunderdale	Dan Sefton	13 October 2001	8.77
326	6	"White Lies"	Reza Moradi	Peter Mills	20 October 2001	8.95
327	7	"Facing the Future"	Nic Phillips	Jo O'Keefe	27 October 2001	7.97
328	8	"For My Next Trick"	Paul Wroblewski	Rachel Gretton and Vicky Cleaver	3 November 2001	8.27
329	9	"Distant Elephants"	Paul Duane	Leslie Stewart	10 November 2001	9.10
330	10	"It's a Family Affair"	Adrian Bean	Chris Webb	17 November 2001	8.76
331	11	"The Morning After"	Sue Dunderdale	Edel Brosnan	24 November 2001	7.71
332	12	"Best Intentions"	Reza Moradi	Maurice Bessman	1 December 2001	7.88
333	13	"Someone to Watch Over Me"	Nic Phillips	Ann Marie Di Mambro	8 December 2001	8.42
334	14	"Happily Ever After"	Ian White	Ginnie Hole	15 December 2001	8.64
335	15	"Life and Soul"	Jim O'Hanlon	Andrew Rattenbury and Katharine Way	22 December 2001	8.47
336	16	"Consequences"	Adrian Bean	Stuart Morris	26 December 2001	7.53
337	17	"Playing with Fire"	Graham Wetherell	Patrick Melanaphy	29 December 2001	9.57
338	18	"Checking In, Checking Out"	Reza Moradi	Dan Sefton	5 January 2002	8.76
339	19	"Blowing the Whistle"	Jeremy Webb	Andrew Holden	12 January 2002	8.18
340	20	"You're Going Home in the Back of an Ambulance"	Ian White	Paul Cornell	19 January 2002	8.77
341	21	"Only the Lonely" (Note: See also "Only the Lonely" series 9)	Jim O'Hanlon	David Lane	26 January 2002	8.87
342	22	"In the Heat of the Night"	Gwennan Sage	Edel Brosnan	2 February 2002	8.79
343	23	"Acceptance"	Graham Wetherell	David Joss Buckley	9 February 2002	8.13
344	24	"Nobody's Perfect" (Note: See also "Nobody's Perfect" series 9 & "Nobody's Perfect" series 20)	Reza Moradi	Jo O'Keefe	16 February 2002	8.86
345	25	"What Becomes of the Broken Hearted"	Lawrence Gordon Clark	Stephen McAteer	23 February 2002	9.27
346	26	"Life Incognito"	A.J. Quinn	Tony McHale	2 March 2002	8.80
347	27	"You Can't Take Them All Home With You"	Graham Wetherell	Leslie Stewart	9 March 2002	8.43
348	28	"Past, Present, Future"	Tim Leandro	Paul Cornell	16 March 2002	8.83
349	29	"Memories"	Neil Adams	Peter Mills	23 March 2002	7.37
350	30	"Hearts and Minds"	A.J. Quinn	Danny McCahon and David Lane	30 March 2002	4.66
351	31	"Dominoes"	Jeremy Webb	James Wood	6 April 2002	7.09
352	32	"Waving Not Drowning" (Note: See also "Not Waving But Drowning" series 9 & "Not Waving But Drowning" series 14)	Sven Arnstein	Edel Brosnan	13 April 2002	7.75
353	33	"Big Rocks and Very Hard Places"	Adrian Bean	David Joss Buckley	20 April 2002	8.06
354	34	"Scapegoat"	Andy Hay	David Joss Buckley	27 April 2002	6.96
355	35	"Too Close for Comfort"	Gwennan Sage	Colin Wyatt	4 May 2002	8.15
356	36	"The Sting"	Graham Wetherell	Leslie Stewart	18 May 2002	9.35
357	37	"Denial"	Gill Wilkinson	Ann Marie Di Mambro	8 June 2002	8.47
358	38	"Taking It All Back to the Streets"	A.J. Quinn	Andrew Holden	15 June 2002	8.58
359	39	"Broken Hearts"	Adrian Bean	Stuart Morris	22 June 2002	8.88
360	40	"Code Red"	Jeremy Webb	Paul Cornell	29 June 2002	9.31

=== Series 17 (2002–2003) ===
No. overall	No. in series	Title	Directed by	Written by	Original release date	UK viewers (millions)
361	1	"Déjà Vu" (Note: See also "Déjà Vu" series 11)	Frank W. Smith	David Joss Buckley	14 September 2002	8.84
362	2	"Protection"	John Dower	Stepheen McAteer	21 September 2002	8.34
363	3	"Judgement Day" (Note: See also "Judgement Day" series 6)	Anthony Garner	Colin Wyatt	28 September 2002	8.36
364	4	"Thicker Than Water" (Note: See also "Thicker Than Water" series 11 & "Blood Is Thicker Than Water" series 28)	Richard Holthouse	Leslie Stewart	5 October 2002	8.55
365	5	"What Little Girls are Made Of"	Gwennan Sage	Jo O'Keefe	12 October 2002	8.98
366	6	"What's Love Got To Do with It?"	Ian White	Peter Mills	19 October 2002	8.48
367	7	"The Ties That Bind" (Note: See also "The Ties That Bind" series 7, "The Ties That Bind" series 13, "The Ties That Bind" series 26 & "The Ties That Bind Us" series 19)	Sven Arnstein	Ann Marie Di Mambro	26 October 2002	9.12
368	8	"It's a Boy Thing"	Jeremy Webb	Andrew Holden	2 November 2002	9.19
369	9	"Innocence"	Jim O'Hanlon	Gregory Evans	9 November 2002	9.42
370	10	"Return of the Native"	A.J. Quinn	Julie Dixon	16 November 2002	8.71
371	11	"Up to Your Neck in It"	Nic Phillips	Edel Brosnan	23 November 2002	8.59
372	12	"Gimme Shelter"	Euros Lyn	Robert Scott-Fraser	30 November 2002	8.49
373	13	"Blame"	Sven Arnstein	Stuart Blackburn	7 December 2002	8.32
374	14	"Feuds and Fury"	Lawrence Gordon Clark	Julian Spilsbury	14 December 2002	9.28
375	15	"Some Comfort, No Joy, and a Bit Too Much Love"	Jim O'Hanlon	David Joss Buckley	21 December 2002	9.10
376	16	"Living for the Moment"	Chris Lovett	Robert Scott-Fraser	28 December 2002	9.14
377	17	"Friend or Foe"	Nic Phillips	Rod Lewis	4 January 2003	9.54
378	18	"Collision Course"	Ian White	Peter Mills	11 January 2003	9.88
379	19	"Sins of the Father"	Jim O'Hanlon	Jo O'Keefe	18 January 2003	9.54
380	20	"Spiteful God"	Lawrence Gordon Clark	Leslie Stewart	25 January 2003	9.45
381	21	"Flight"	Jim O'Hanlon	Len Collin	1 February 2003	9.45
382	22	"Love Hurts"	Declan O'Dwyer	Edel Brosnan	8 February 2003	9.77
383	23	"Hitting Home – Part One"	Gwennan Sage	Ann Marie Di Mambro	15 February 2003	9.33
384	24	"Hitting Home – Part Two"	Tania Diez	Ann Marie Di Mambro	22 February 2003	9.66
385	25	"Dire Straits"	Dominic Santana	Gregory Evans	1 March 2003	10.00
386	26	"Fool for Love"	Jeremy Webb	Ginnie Hole	8 March 2003	9.72
387	27	"Keep It in the Family" (Note: See also "Keeping It in the Family" series 9)	Nic Phillips	Danny McCahon	15 March 2003	9.12
388	28	"A Hard Day's Night"	Richard Holthouse	Robert Scott-Fraser	22 March 2003	9.06
389	29	"Side Effects"	Gwennan Sage	Stephen McAteer	29 March 2003	9.32
390	30	"An Act of God"	Euros Lyn	Jason Sutton	5 April 2003	9.01
391	31	"The Point of No Return"	Declan O'Dwyer	David Joss Buckley	12 April 2003	8.64
392	32	"Stuck in the Middle with You"	Tim Holloway	Robert Scott-Fraser	19 April 2003	9.30
393	33	"Getting Through"	Deborah Paige	Catherine Tregenna	26 April 2003	9.22
394	34	"Hurt the One You Love"	Andy Goddard	Steve Griffiths	3 May 2003	8.69
395	35	"An Accident Waiting To Happen"	Gwennan Sage	Paul Cornell	10 May 2003	7.90
396	36	"Out On a Limb"	Richard Holthouse	Danny McCahon	17 May 2003	9.27
397	37	"Baby Blues"	Tania Diez	Julie White	31 May 2003	8.03
398	38	"Last Man Standing"	Tim Holloway	Rod Lewis	7 June 2003	8.22
399	39	"Three in a Bed"	Ian White	Joe Turner	14 June 2003	7.71
400	40	"A Special Day"	Declan O'Dwyer	Gregory Evans	21 June 2003	8.87

=== Series 18 (2003–2004) ===
No. overall	No. in series	Title	Directed by	Written by	Original release date	UK viewers (millions)
401	1	"End of the Line – Part One"	Euros Lyn	Ann Marie Di Mambro	13 September 2003	9.17
402	2	"End of the Line – Part Two"	Ian White	Danny McCahon	14 September 2003	9.05
403	3	"Breathe Deeply"	Peter Cregeen	Chris Ould	20 September 2003	9.50
404	4	"Perks of the Job"	Gwennan Sage	Emma Frost	27 September 2003	9.51
405	5	"Flash in the Pan"	Roberto Bangura	Jason Sutton	4 October 2003	9.33
406	6	"Against Protocol"	Dominic Santana	Edel Brosnan	11 October 2003	8.89
407	7	"Can't Let Go"	Shani Grewal	Danny McCahon	18 October 2003	9.02
408	8	"Truth or Dare"	Karen Stowe	Marc Starbuck	25 October 2003	9.06
409	9	"In the Frame"	Declan O'Dwyer	Catherine Tregenna	1 November 2003	9.05
410	10	"Black Dog Day"	Jeremy Webb	Robert Scott-Fraser	8 November 2003	8.37
411	11	"Falling for a Friend"	Ian White	Joe Turner	15 November 2003	9.49
412	12	"Second Best"	Marc Jobst	Gregory Evans and Julie Gearey	22 November 2003	9.62
413	13	"First Impressions" (Note: See also "First Impressions" series 9, "First Impressions" series 20 & "First Impressions" series 28)	Chris Lovett	Jo O'Keefe	29 November 2003	9.44
414	14	"Christmas Spirit"	S.J. Clarkson	Emma Frost	6 December 2003	8.95
415	15	"Never Judge a Book"	Euros Lyn	Robert Scott-Fraser	13 December 2003	9.20
416	16	"Eat, Drink and Be Merry"	Ian White	Jason Sutton	20 December 2003	7.71
417	17	"I Got It Bad and Ain't That Good"	Nic Phillips	Robert Scott-Fraser	27 December 2003	8.50
418	18	"Ahead of the Game"	Tania Diez	Chris Ould	3 January 2004	9.43
419	19	"Where There's Life"	Jane Powell	Ginne Hole	10 January 2004	9.77
420	20	"No Weddings and a Funeral"	John Greening	Richard Vincent	17 January 2004	10.11
421	21	"Emotional Rescue – Part One"	Ian White	Ginnie Hole	24 January 2004	9.53
422	22	"Emotional Rescue – Part Two"	Gwennan Sage	Stephen McAteer	31 January 2004	9.62
423	23	"Passions and Convictions"	Keith Washington	Jim O'Hanlon	7 February 2004	9.26
424	24	"Fallen Hero"	Peter Butler	David Lane	14 February 2004	9.13
425	25	"Taking Care"	Michael Buffong	Maurice Beesman and Danny McCahon	21 February 2004	9.61
426	26	"What Parents Do"	Graeme Harper	Danny McCahon	28 February 2004	9.59
427	27	"Love and Loathing"	Nic Phillips	Jason Sutton	6 March 2004	8.94
428	28	"Finding Faith"	Jeremy Webb	Catherine Tregenna	13 March 2004	9.25
429	29	"Parenthood"	S.J. Clarkson	Paul Marx	27 March 2004	6.48
430	30	"Another Perfect Day"	Declan O'Dwyer	Chris Ould	3 April 2004	8.87
431	31	"I Love You, I Hate You"	Gwennan Sage	Stephen McAteer	10 April 2004	7.27
432	32	"Forget Me Not"	Dominic Lees	Peter Mills	17 April 2004	8.59
433	33	"Lock Down"	Marc Jobst	Gregory Evans	24 April 2004	7.61
434	34	"Much Wants More"	Jane Powell	Linda Thompson	1 May 2004	7.55
435	35	"Breaking Point"	Terry Iland	Jackie Pavlenko	8 May 2004	8.62
436	36	"Don't Go There"	Robert Del Maestro	Danny McCahon	23 May 2004	6.40
437	37	"World Gone Wrong – Part One"	Gwennan Sage	Jason Sutton	29 May 2004	7.95
438	38	"World Gone Wrong – Part Two"	Gwennan Sage	Jason Sutton	30 May 2004	7.59
439	39	"The Good Father"	Sean Geoghegan	Catherine Tregenna	5 June 2004	7.78
440	40	"Dreams and Disappointments"	Marc Jobst	Jo O'Keefe	17 July 2004	7.83
441	41	"And the Bride Wore Red"	S.J. Clarkson	Stephen McAteer	24 July 2004	7.69
442	42	"A Dangerous Initiative"	Shani Grewal	Paul Marx	31 July 2004	7.26
443	43	"Inside Out"	Dominic Lees	Paul Ebbs	7 August 2004	7.00
444	44	"Who Cares?"	Nic Phillips	David Lloyd	14 August 2004	6.78
445	45	"Love, Honour & Betray"	Declan O'Dwyer	Gregory Evans	21 August 2004	6.78
446	46	"Ring of Truth"	Ian White	Danny McCahon	28 August 2004	7.75

=== Series 19 (2004–2005) ===
No. overall	No. in series	Title	Directed by	Written by	Original release date	UK viewers (millions)
447	1	"The Ties That Bind Us – Part One" (Note: See also "The Ties That Bind" series 7, "The Ties That Bind" series 13, "The Ties That Bind" series 17 & "The Ties That Bind" series 26)	Jeremy Webb	Catherine Tregenna	11 September 2004	8.53
448	2	"The Ties That Bind Us – Part Two"	Marc Jobst	Ginnie Hole	12 September 2004	8.24
449	3	"Out With a Bang"	Robert Del Maestro	Emma Frost	18 September 2004	7.56
450	4	"Love Labours... Lost"	Christopher King	Peter Mills	25 September 2004	8.52
451	5	"Facing Up" (Note: See also "Facing Up" series 6, "Facing Up" series 12 & "Face Up" series 23)	Ian White	Linda Thompson	2 October 2004	7.81
452	6	"A Life Lost"	Chris Lovett	Julie Dixon	9 October 2004	8.04
453	7	"When the Devil Drives"	Jim O'Hanlon	Paul Ebbs	16 October 2004	8.81
454	8	"Three's a Crowd"	Dominic Lees	David Robertson	23 October 2004	8.72
455	9	"Little White Lies"	James Strong	Stephen Mcateer	30 October 2004	7.78
456	10	"Dangerous Games" (Note: See also "Dangerous Games" series 6)	Brett Fallis	Paul Marx	6 November 2004	8.00
457	11	"Horses for Courses"	Ged Maguire	Jason Sutton	13 November 2004	8.69
458	12	"Past Imperfect"	Shani Grewal	Danny McCahon	20 November 2004	8.25
459	13	"Responsibility"	Robert Del Maestro	Danny Mccahon	27 November 2004	8.10
460	14	"Love Bites"	Ian White	Julie Blackie	4 December 2004	7.92
461	15	"Who Knows Best"	Dominic Lees	Peter Mills	18 December 2004	7.94
462	16	"Forsaking All Others"	Paul Norton Walker	Emma Frost	19 December 2004	7.27
463	17	"Casualty@Holby City – Part One"	Michael Offer	Johanne McAndrew	26 December 2004	8.91
464	18	"Secrets That We Keep"	Chris Lovett	David Robertson	1 January 2005	9.24
465	19	"Fathers, Mothers, Daughters, Brothers"	Robert Del Maestro	Paul Ebbs	8 January 2005	9.03
466	20	"First Do No Harm"	Ian White	Stephen Mcateer	15 January 2005	9.10
467	21	"Thrown Out"	Shani Grewal	Peter Mills	22 January 2005	8.71
468	22	"The Cost of Honesty"	Paul Norton Walker	Peter Mills	29 January 2005	8.88
469	23	"Truth Will Out"	Terry Iland	Linda Thompson	5 February 2005	9.18
470	24	"Hoping, Wishing, Longing"	Dominic Lees	Julie Blackie	19 February 2005	8.71
471	25	"Naming Names"	Christopher King	Catherine Tregenna	26 February 2005	9.23
472	26	"Boys Don't Cry" (Note: See also "Big Boys Don’t Cry" series 5)	Chris Lovett	Jo O'Keefe	5 March 2005	8.08
473	27	"Family Day"	Robert Del Maestro	Danny Mccahon	13 March 2005	7.00
474	28	"Animals"	Declan O'Dwyer	Gregory Evans	19 March 2005	8.32
475	29	"Forbidden Love"	S. J. Clarkson	Jason Sutton	20 March 2005	7.42
476	30	"And On That Farm"	Graeme Harper	Stephen McAteer	26 March 2005	7.09
477	31	"Running Out of Kisses"	Brett Fallis	Paul Ebbs	2 April 2005	7.87
478	32	"In the Dark"	Joss Agnew	Catherine Tregenna	9 April 2005	8.48
479	33	"Cops and Robbers"	Martin Sharp	Katie Hims	16 April 2005	8.54
480	34	"Sweet Revenge"	Nic Phillips	Jo O'Keefe	23 April 2005	8.21
481	35	"Desperate Measures"	Nic Phillips	Rob Hume	30 April 2005	7.68
482	36	"A Question of Loyalty"	Chris Lovett	Peter Mills	7 May 2005	8.35
483	37	"Fat Chance"	Jim O'Hanlon	Danny McCahon and Robert Scott-Fraser	14 May 2005	7.99
484	38	"Truth and Consequences"	Shani Grewal	Peter Lloyd	4 June 2005	8.23
485	39	"Baby Love"	Luke Watson	Peter Lloyd	11 June 2005	7.38
486	40	"Swallowers"	Declan O'Dwyer	Gregory Evans	18 June 2005	6.35
487	41	"The Long Goodbye"	Christopher King	Nick West	25 June 2005	7.14
488	42	"A Father's Love"	Craig Lines	Stephen McAteer	9 July 2005	6.78
489	43	"There are Worse Things I Could Do"	Brett Fallis	Julie Blackie	16 July 2005	6.65
490	44	"Brief Encounters"	Jill Robertson	Catrin Clarke	23 July 2005	7.44
491	45	"Aftermath"	Rhys Powys	Jason Sutton	30 July 2005	7.15
492	46	"You Need Friends"	Murilo Pasta	Jo O'Keefe	6 August 2005	7.05
493	47	"Smoke & Mirrors"	Martin Sharp	Rob Hume	13 August 2005	7.53
494	48	"Truth, Lies & Videotape"	Terry Iland	Peter Mills	20 August 2005	7.31

=== Series 20 (2005–2006) ===
No. overall	No. in series	Title	Directed by	Written by	Original release date	UK viewers (millions)
495	1	"Holding On – Part One"	Paul Norton Walker	Ann Marie Di Mambro	10 September 2005	7.65
496	2	"Holding On – Part Two"	Paul Norton Walker	Ann Marie Di Mambro	11 September 2005	7.20
497	3	"Deep Water"	Joss Agnew	Linda Thompson	17 September 2005	7.73
498	4	"That's Amore"	Ashley Way	Katie Hims	24 September 2005	7.57
499	5	"Paper Moon"	Gwennan Sage	Ginnie Hole	1 October 2005	6.42
500	6	"Sticks and Stones"	Brett Fallis	Stephen McAteer	8 October 2005	6.44
501	7	"All's Fair in Love and War" (Note: See also "All's Fair" series 5, "All's Fair" series 10 & "All's Fair" series 16)	Jill Robertson	Stephen McAteer	15 October 2005	7.06
502	8	"For Better or Worse"	Gill Wilkinson	Peter Mills and Lucy Catherine	22 October 2005	7.29
503	9	"Teacher's Pet"	Rob Evans	Jason Sutton	24 October 2005	5.56
504	10	"Crash and Burn"	Rob Evans	Jason Sutton	25 October 2005	5.96
505	11	"Big Bang Theory"	Steve Kelly	Ray Brooking	5 November 2005	7.84
506	12	"Love and Duty"	Craig Lines	Linda Thompson	12 November 2005	8.50
507	13	"Antisocial Behaviour"	Luke Watson	Gregory Evans	19 November 2005	8.53
508	14	"Getting Involved"	Emma Bodger	Paul Ebbs	26 November 2005	7.80
509	15	"Skin Deep"	Dominic Lees	Jo O'Keefe	3 December 2005	6.88
510	16	"Enough's Enough"	Rob MacGillivray	Danny McCahon	10 December 2005	7.57
511	17	"Do They Know it's Christmas?"	Declan O'Dwyer	Ann Marie Di Mambro	17 December 2005	8.09
512	18	"Deny Thy Father"	Paul Harrison	Al Hunter Ashton and Pete Hambly	24 December 2005	8.00
513	19	"Out of your Depth"	Joss Agnew	Catherine Tregenna	31 December 2005	6.63
514	20	"Poisoned Love"	Shani S. Grewal	Peter Mills	7 January 2006	8.18
515	21	"Crossing the Line" (Note: See also "Crossing the Line" series 9)	Chris Lovett	Ming Ho	14 January 2006	8.26
516	22	"The Things We Do for Love"	Marc Jobst	Jason Sutton and Catherine Tregenna	21 January 2006	8.14
517	23	"It's a Man Thing"	John Dower	Jim Davies and Steve Lightfoot	28 January 2006	7.75
518	24	"Trust in Me"	Deborah Paige	Stephen McAteer	4 February 2006	7.98
519	25	"Out of the Past"	Emma Bodger	Jo O'Keefe	11 February 2006	7.11
520	26	"The Lost Boys"	Paul Wroblewski	Sian Evans	18 February 2006	7.77
521	27	"Worlds Apart"	Steve Finn	Ann Marie Di Mambro	25 February 2006	8.05
522	28	"Nobody's Perfect" (Note: See also "Nobody's Perfect" series 9 & "Nobody's Perfect" series 16)	Gill Wilkinson	Gregory Evans	4 March 2006	8.26
523	29	"Heroes and Villains"	Joss Agnew	Steve Lightfoot	11 March 2006	7.89
524	30	"Family Matters" (Note: See also "Family Matters" series 7 & "Family Matters" series 27)	Ashley Way	Danny McCahon	18 March 2006	7.94
525	31	"Walk Before You Run"	Brett Fallis	Peter Mills	25 March 2006	8.23
526	32	"Going Under"	Lesley Manning	Ming Ho	1 April 2006	7.75
527	33	"Blind Spots"	Paul Murphy	Linda Thompson	8 April 2006	7.72
528	34	"First Impressions" (Note: See also "First Impressions" series 9, "First Impressions" series 18 & "First Impressions" series 28)	Dez McCarthy	Gary Parker	15 April 2006	7.30
529	35	"Lost and Found"	Dominic Lees	Katie Hims	22 April 2006	6.55
530	36	"No Way Back"	Deborah Paige	Jonathan Rich	29 April 2006	7.70
531	37	"A Problem Halved"	Jill Robertson	Nazrin Choudhury	6 May 2006	7.07
532	38	"Secrets and Lies"	Steve Kelly	Sian Evans	13 May 2006	7.68
533	39	"Target Man"	Shani S. Grewal	Stephen McAteer	27 May 2006	6.23
534	40	"All at Sea"	Ben Morris	Johanne McAndrew and Elliot Hope	3 June 2006	6.79
535	41	"Abide With Me"	Chris Lovett	Peter Mills	10 June 2006	6.50
536	42	"Silent Ties"	Darcia Martin	Jo O'Keefe	17 June 2006	6.16
537	43	"Needle"	Nic Phillips	Danny McCahon and Steve Lightfoot	22 July 2006	6.23
538	44	"Perfect Day"	Rob MacGillivray	Gaby Chiappe	29 July 2006	6.97
539	45	"Happy Hour"	John Dower	David Joss Buckley	5 August 2006	6.36
540	46	"The Truth Game"	Craig Lines	Linda Thompson	12 August 2006	6.85
541	47	"Last Orders"	Rupert Such	Jason Sutton	19 August 2006	7.13
542	48	"Get What You Deserve"	Brett Fallis	Ginnie Hole	26 August 2006	6.90

== Casualty@Holby City ==
Of the nine crossover episodes broadcast as Casualty@Holby City, five aired in Casualty's regular timeslot, while the remaining four — "Casualty@Holby City: Part Two", "Test Your Metal", "A Great Leap Forward" and "Deny Thy Father: Part Two" — were broadcast in Holby City's timeslot.

No.	Episode	Directed by	Written by	Original release date	UK viewers (millions)
1	"Casualty@Holby City: Part One"	Michael Offer	Johanne McAndrew	26 December 2004	8.91
2	"Casualty@Holby City: Part Two"	Michael Offer	Johanne McAndrew	28 December 2004	8.82
3	"Something We Can Do"	Shani S. Grewal	Steve Lightfoot	27 August 2005	7.32
4	"Teacher's Pet"	Rob Evans	Jason Sutton	24 October 2005	5.56
5	"Crash and Burn"	Rob Evans	Jason Sutton	25 October 2005	5.96
6	"Test Your Metal"	Rob Evans	Suzie Smith	26 October 2005	4.57
7	"A Great Leap Forward"	Rob Evans	Suzie Smith	27 October 2005	5.64
8	"Deny Thy Father: Part One"	Paul Harrison	Al Hunter Ashton & Pete Hambly	24 December 2005	8.00
9	"Deny Thy Father: Part Two"	Paul Harrison	Gaby Chiappe	27 December 2005	8.86

== See also ==
- Lists of Casualty episodes
