= Gittins =

Gittins is a surname. Notable people with the surname include:

- Albert Gittins (1897–1977), English cricketer
- Anne Gittins (Anne Francis, née Gittins) (1738–1800), English classical scholar and poet
- Charles Gittins, American lawyer
- Chris Gittins (1902–1988), British character actor, played Walter Gabriel in The Archers
- Jack Gittins (1893–1956), English footballer
- Jeremy Gittins (born 1956), English actor, played the Vicar on the British sitcom Keeping Up Appearances
- John C. Gittins, professor and Emeritus Fellow at Keble College, Oxford University
- Ken Gittins (born 1966), Australian rugby league footballer
- Paul Gittins, New Zealand actor, played Doctor Michael McKenna in Shortland Street
- Rob Gittins, British television and radio writer
- Robert H. Gittins (1869–1957), American lawyer, newspaper publisher and politician
- Ron Gittins (1939–2019), British outsider artist
- Ross Gittins AM (born 1948), Australian political and economic journalist and author
- Walter Gittins (1865–1890), English professional footballer

== See also ==
- Gittins index, measure of the reward that can be achieved by a process evolving from its present state onwards with the probability that it will be terminated in the future
- Gettins, surname
- Gittens, surname
