= Casualty series 9 =

Ninth series of Casualty

Casualty
- Series 9
- Starring: Ian Bleasdale; Steven Brand; Lisa Coleman; Sorcha Cusack; Sue Devaney; Jane Gurnett; Clive Mantle; Jason Merrells; Joan Oliver; Patrick Robinson; Derek Thompson; Julia Watson
- No. of episodes: 24

Release
- Original network: BBC One
- Original release: 17 September 1994 – 25 March 1995

Series chronology
- ← Previous; Series 8 Next → Series 10

The ninth series of the British medical drama television series Casualty commenced airing in the United Kingdom on BBC One on 17 September 1994 and finished on 25 March 1995.

== Production ==
Corinne Hollingworth, who had previously worked on EastEnders and Eldorado, replaced Michael Ferguson as producer. The debate over whether Casualty should air twice a week resurfaced once again causing unrest among the cast and crew. Fortunately, the proposal was abandoned, preserving local jobs and ensuring that production remained rooted in Bristol rather than relocating to London. Casualty proved its worth as a weekly 50-minute drama, maintaining its distinctive appeal and loyal audience.

The series initially met with negative responses from some viewers due a key visual change – the switch from the videotape visual style to a 'filmic' look. Many felt the grainy new visuals lacked the immediacy and clarity of videotape. The filmic effect was added in post-production, but was removed after a few weeks so that all remaining episodes in the series reverted to the familiar videotape look. In spite of earlier setbacks, the series secured audiences of over 18 million, affirming its widespread popularity and viewer commitment.

== Cast ==
=== Overview ===
The ninth series of Casualty features a cast of characters working in the emergency department of Holby City Hospital. Only 5 of the regular cast from the previous series were retained. Clive Mantle starred as emergency medicine consultant Mike Barratt. Derek Thompson continued his role as clinical nurse manager Charlie Fairhead. Patrick Robinson and Jane Gurnett appeared as charge nurse Martin "Ash" Ashford and staff nurse Rachel Longworth. Ian Bleasdale portrayed paramedic Josh Griffiths.

Joan Oliver, Sorcha Cusack, Steven Brand and Jason Merrells were introduced in episode one as senior house officer Eddie Gordon, senior staff nurse Kate Wilson, staff nurse Adam Cooke and receptionist Matt Hawley. Lisa Coleman and Sue Devaney were also introduced throughout the series as staff nurse Jude Korcanik and paramedic Liz Harker respectively. They made their first appearances in episodes two and ten respectively. Colette Brown appeared in three episodes of the series as Adam's former wife Emma Quinn. Julia Watson decided to reprise her role of Barbara "Baz" Hayes, now a locum emergency medicine consultant. Watson had last appeared on the show at the conclusion of the first series and returned in episode twenty. She stated appearing on Casualty was one of her favourite roles, adding "…it's great to be given the chance to come back and appear in it again." Oliver and Brand departed at the conclusion of the series.

=== Main characters ===
- Ian Bleasdale as Josh Griffiths
- Steven Brand as Adam Cooke (episodes 1−24)
- Lisa Coleman as Jude Korcanik (from episode 2)
- Sorcha Cusack as Kate Wilson (from episode 1)
- Sue Devaney as Liz Harker (from episode 10)
- Jane Gurnett as Rachel Longworth
- Clive Mantle as Mike Barratt
- Jason Merrells as Matt Hawley (from episode 1)
- Joan Oliver as Eddie Gordon (episodes 1−24)
- Patrick Robinson as Martin "Ash" Ashford
- Derek Thompson as Charlie Fairhead
- Julia Watson as Barbara "Baz" Hayes (from episode 20)

=== Recurring and guest characters ===
- Colette Brown as Emma Quinn (episodes 6−15)
- Frank Grimes as Brian Hawley (episode 17)

== Episodes ==
No. overall	No. in series	Title	Directed by	Written by	Original release date	UK viewers (millions)
129	1	"Blood's Thicker" (Note: See also "Blood Is Thicker Than Water" series 28)	Henry Foster	Sam Snape	17 September 1994	18.45
Josh is now working as a motorcycle paramedic while Ash finds it difficult being senior to Kate Wilson, the new senior staff nurse who used to be a ward sister. A teenage mother named Trudy is brought in after being beaten up and is revealed to have sold one of her kidneys. Her mother (Linda Henry) agrees to take in her and her child and breaks up with her abusive boyfriend. Colin breaks out of a young offenders' institution and tries to convince his brother Rory to run away with him. Rory refuses but, after chasing Colin across some waste ground, he is hit by a falling girder and dies in hospital. Charlie is offered the position of contracts manager but turns it down.
130	2	"First Impressions" (Note: See also "First Impressions" series 18, "First Impressions" series 20 & "First Impressions" series 28)	Sallie Aprahamian	Lisa Evans	24 September 1994	19.01
New nurse Jude Korcanik looks after a wheelchair-using patient with MS who asks for the morning-after pill. Jude assumes she has been raped but in fact she merely has a boyfriend her mother doesn't know about; her mother is understanding when she finds out. The police are called to a fight at a pub and a new officer stops a drunk-looking biker riding away, causing him to hit his head. The biker is later brought into hospital and dies of a cranial haemorrhage but Kate keeps quiet about the officer's involvement on learning it was unrelated to the head injury. Mike counsels the biker's parents (Des McAleer and Frances Tomelty). A woman collapses at work with an asthma attack and admits she left her 10-year-old daughter at home alone; they are hiding from her abusive partner. Rachel alerts Social Services against Eddie's wishes and the pair abscond from the department. Matt controls crowds after a Holby City FC player is brought in with an injury he sustained during a match.
131	3	"Keeping it in the Family" (Note: See also "Keep It In the Family" series 17)	David Innes Edwards	Keith Temple	1 October 1994	—
An office worker (Rebecca Lacey) is brought in after taking a tumble at work. She is eager to get back since her husband is unemployed. She eventually admits to Kate that she fell because her employer (Jack Ellis), who is married to her sister, was sexually harassing her. She decides to reveal the truth and resign. Mike is snappy with the staff and admits to Charlie his wife has left him; Kate also realises the truth. A middle-aged couple are at a supermarket when the woman has her bag snatched; the man chases after the thieves but collapses. He has hid the fact he has angina from her and dies in hospital. Ash learns the couple were not husband and wife but brother and sister in an incestuous relationship. A woman named Marian (Gabrielle Lloyd) is brought in after shutting her hand in an ironing board. Josh and the police find an elderly woman stabbed to death and her daughter Ruth stabbed and injured. Rachel notices a photo of Ruth in Marian's bag but Marian beats her before fleeing. Charlie and Mike stop her throwing herself out a window; Ruth is her sister and she and her mother moved into Marian's house, drove her husband away and constantly bullied and belittled her until she snapped.
132	4	"Chasing the Dragon"	Chris Clough	Rob Gittins	8 October 1994	—
Mike is reluctant to discuss his marital problems with Ash in Charlie's absence but eventually confides in him, unaware Kate has already filled him in. Two homeless teenagers, Vicki and Karen, agree to work as prostitutes for a madam, Steph. She injects them both with heroin, unaware it is a powerful strain, and Karen dies of an overdose. Vicki makes a statement to the police but ignores Kate's offer of help and goes back to Steph, while Rachel's recent experiences have put her off helping patients. A man who has made extreme changes to his diet is revealed to have kept the fact he has cancer from his wife. Josh brings in a woman (Lesley Nicol) who claims she had a fall but admits to Eddie she crashed the car and doesn't want her husband to find out. When he returns home early, he reports the car stolen and his wife keeps quiet, even when the owner of the garage where she left the car is arrested. Matt arranges a date with student nurse Claire, while Adam is bothered by the presence in the department of registrar Glen Quinn, his former wife's new husband.
133	5	"Love and Affection"	Sue Dunderdale	Billy Hamon	15 October 1994	—
Two sisters go to a Take That concert but one of them is injured in a crowd crush. The hospital staff eventually learn she has cystic fibrosis and the girls went without their parents' permission. She dies in theatre from a ruptured liver. A businessman, Rick, holds a dinner for the local MP and his wife but his wife, Brenda, cuts her hand on a broken glass. The staff learn she has had several similar injuries but Rick denies harming her; however, he later berates and belittles her in front of the staff and Dawn, the MP's wife. Brenda is diagnosed with depression brought on by his treatment of her, which has made her accident-prone. Kate fills Adam and Jude in on Mike's situation and Adam tells Matt; Mike is furious to discover it is common knowledge. A man named Partridge (Jason Watkins) claims he was abducted and impregnated by aliens and saw William Shakespeare on their spaceship. A bulge on his stomach turns out to be shingles and a street poet dressed as Shakespeare appears in reception but as Partridge goes home the street lights around him flicker on and off.
134	6	"Negative Equity"	Geoff Feld	Andrew Holden	22 October 1994	15.89
Rachel is increasingly paranoid and is avoiding dangerous shifts and duties, but with Kate wanting time off for his wedding anniversary Adam has to miss his daughter Jessica's birthday party. His former wife Emma brings in Jessica to see him at the hospital. Eddie bumps into a cleaner who later complains of headaches and sends her for a CT scan, which shows she has an aneurysm. The woman leaves before she can get her results and Kate convinces Eddie to follow her home and bring her back to the hospital. A gay man, Rhys (Jake Wood), is attacked by an old enemy, Philip (Charlie Creed Miles) and calls his ex-boyfriend Danny, who is now engaged to Sylvie, for support. Philip shoots Rhys and Josh calls for helicopter support which Mike and Rachel supply. Rachel gives Mike advice on getting divorced. Danny decides to go back to Rhys and Philip knocks Rachel over while fleeing from the police.
135	7	"A Breed Apart"	Chris Lovett	David Joss Buckley	29 October 1994	15.74
The department braces itself for the fall-out from an anti-racist demonstration against the racist group AXE. A handyman turns up at the department with a cut hand and does a number of odd jobs, while Charlie learns an old man has been unable to wash his own feet and washes them for him. Graham Evans leads a group of demonstrators, including Ash's friend Patrick (Shaun Parkes), down a back street where they encounter AXE thugs and a riot breaks out, during which Patrick's girlfriend Nikki (Connie Hyde) is crushed, later dying in hospital. Rachel hides in the toilet when AXE turn up at the hospital for treatment and Kate convinces her to get counselling. Leading member Mark Hitchens (Daniel Ryan) is thrown out after threatening Eddie and getting into a fight with Ash. Matt recognizes Evans as a member of AXE and admits to Charlie he was friends with the group when he was younger, not understanding what they stood for. Ash is sent home but Hitchens attacks him with a knife outside the hospital. Eddie sees Ash strike him, but fails to notice Evans hiding the knife.
136	8	"In the Black"	David Innes Edwards	Peter Bowker	5 November 1994	17.10
A girl and her young mother are shoplifting from a department store. The girl is caught despite a security guard's (Kenneth Farrington) reluctance to chase her; he collapses during the altercation and they are both taken to the hospital where the girl refuses to give answers to the staff. The store manager forces the guard to help with prosecution and the girl's mother reveals she is his daughter, who only recently met him for the first time, and he set up the theft to get rid of her. His wife (Ann Lynn) offers to help the pair out. The police turn up to investigate the clash between Ash and Hitchens, who injured his eye socket. With Eddie unable to confirm anything other than the blow, Ash is charged with assault. Mine owner Alan finds one of his employees, Duncan, stealing coal after hours. Duncan knocks a support away during the altercation and is hit by falling rubble. Josh arrives to help but then the mine caves in, trapping them both. Josh learns Duncan was once area manager but was made redundant. Mike and a rescue team cut them out but Duncan dies of his injuries at the scene.
137	9	"Crossing the Line" (Note: See also "Crossing the Line" series 20)	Catherine Morshead	Ashley Pharoah	12 November 1994	—
Teenager Chloe visits her boyfriend Ken but he has been warned off her by his employer Debbie (Deborah Findlay), a friend of Chloe's mother Fiona (Pippa Guard) . A woman named Shirley (Angeline Ball) has a violent argument with her boyfriend Mark before taking a minibus full of elderly people out; distracted, she runs over Chloe. Chloe believes she is pregnant and gets Adam to give her a test in front of Fiona, but it turns out to be negative. Chloe reveals she knows Fiona and Debbie are lovers and the three of them begin to get on better. Kate realises Shirley has PMT, having stopped taking the pill because she was insecure about Mark having children from an earlier relationship, and Mark is horrified to learn she was trying to get pregnant. Young boy Danny finds his father Russell has overdosed before he leaves for school and calls the ambulance. He tells the staff his mother died in a climbing accident and he has no other family but in fact his maternal grandmother Maureen (Colette O'Neil) is still alive: She blames Russell for the accident, as does Russell himself. Russell and Maureen agree Danny should stay with Maureen until Russell gets over his depression. Glen and Emma have separated and Emma asks Adam to look after Jessica. Rachel begins counselling. Ash is charged with ABH and the police interview the staff; after pressing from Jude, Matt tells them that he heard Hitchens threatens Ash and agrees to give evidence.
138	10	"Only the Lonely" (Note: See also "Only the Lonely" series 16, "Only the Lonely" series 25 & "Only the Lonely" series 28)	Robert Gabriel	Ashley Pharoah	19 November 1994	17.24
A teacher (David Horovitch) takes his Down's Syndrome son to the swimming pool where he meets with his mistress. While he is breaking up with her, his son hits his head on the water slide. He admits the truth to his wife (Marion Bailey) and their son recovers. A frequent patient known as Professor stabs himself in the toilet and it is some time before Jude finds him in reception; he recovers. Mike attends a rugby match on his day off; the player-manager, Frank (Tony Haygarth), is a friend. Frank's son Rob is moving to London with his girlfriend but stays for the match. Rob punches an opposing player who taunted him and breaks up a scrum, causing Frank to injure his spine. Josh, back on the ambulances, arrives with his new partner Liz, who tries to shoo Mike away, unaware of who he is. Mike tells Frank he may never walk again and Rob decides to stay and look after him.
139	11	"The Facts of Life"	Robert Gabriel	Andrew Holden	10 December 1994	—
A couple (Hermione Norris and Tom Russell) and their two young daughters go to visit the woman's parents (Angela Douglas and Mark Kingston). The two girls both stray close to a swimming pool while their grandfather is looking after them. Their parents and grandmother go to pick up a new car but their father crashes the car after dropping a cigarette; all three are killed and the grandfather is left looking after the girls. An elderly couple (Carmel McSharry and Tony Melody) go back to their first house and break into the shed, but it collapses on the man. At the hospital, it turns out he has skin cancer and has decided against treatment. Ash's court case has made the papers and the Personnel officer (Gina McKee) wants to suspend him. He refuses to go without official notification from the chief executive. He helps Eddie out by removing a moth that had become trapped in a woman's ear before being officially suspended.
140	12	"Under the Weather"	Ian White	Lisa Evans	17 December 1994	—
Two young brothers shelter in a storm drain but are trapped, along with their father, when it is flooded. They are eventually rescued but the younger boy dies in hospital. A woman calling herself Vivienne Guyett comes in and is discovered to have terminal cancer. When another Vivienne Guyett (Barbara Murray) turns up looking for her friend Connie, it turns out Connie has used Vivienne's name, constantly seeking further opinions because she refuses to accept her diagnosis. She finally accepts the truth. Charlie commiserates with Ash over his suspension. An elderly man tries to throw a bag off a bridge but is distracted and falls. At the hospital, he recounts the massacre of two hundred prisoners in Greece during the war. It is only as he is leaving that he tells Jude that he was one of those carried out the massacre; Jude finds the bag, which he threw in a bin, contains his war medal.
141	13	"Talking Turkey"	Sallie Aprahamian	Lilie Ferrari	24 December 1994	—
Two brothers die in a car crash. Policeman John Milligan and his younger partner Tracey come in with them; they are having an affair and he intends to tell his wife. Several policemen come in with food poisoning but John dies from bowel problems and Tracey elects not to tell his wife of the affair. A girl (Syan Blake) reacts badly to family coming to stay and runs off. She is found being sick on the train track; she is bulimic. Charlie discovers her younger sister was killed by a train after she dared her to run across the track and the family have never come to terms with it; she was expected to share a room with her cousin, the first time since her sister died. A farmer's (Ken Hutchison) daughter is brought in after collapsing with abdominal pains while exercising; it turns out she is in labour and had not known she was pregnant. Her father goes after her boyfriend, one of the farmhands, with an axe, causing him to hit his head on some machinery, but all is soon forgiven and he gives the staff a plucked turkey as a thank you present. Rachel convinces Mike to spend Christmas with her and they leave with the turkey, which only Charlie sees.
142	14	"End of the Road"	David Innes Edwards	Keith Temple	14 January 1995	—
Ash visits the department to ask Mike and Charlie to be character witnesses, while Eddie treats an Elvis Presley fan (Denise Coffey) whose costume has given her an infected foot. Dennis Martin (David Hargreaves), who has Alzheimer's, is found by his sister Iris (Paula Jacobs) having taken an overdose. His wife Caroline (Jennie Linden) and Iris' husband Ronnie admit they left him alone with the pills to see if he'd take them. Jude overhears this and Ash advises her to keep quiet. Geoff (John Vine) meets with his mistress Bev to return a bracelet she bought him; her neighbour Colin attempts to blackmail her over the affair. While Bev attends Geoff's birthday party, some lads lock her son Nathan in a car boot and accidentally crash it into the party, injuring Bev, Colin and Geoff's wife Sheila. As ambulances are taking them to the hospital, Dennis deliberately steps out in front of the convoy and is killed.
143	15	"Learning Curve"	Pip Broughton	Tony McHale	21 January 1995	—
Jude sees Evans threatening Matt to try and stop him testifying in Ash's defence. A boy is savaged by a neighbour's dogs after going to retrieve a Frisbee and left needing plastic surgery. The dog owner tries to blackmail the boy's grandmother into keeping quiet by threatening to report him for trespass but Mike has her thrown out of the hospital. Teenager Ian receives treatment after getting into a fight before taking his girlfriend Charlotte and two other boys, Mark and Paul, out for a drive. Mark tries to assault Charlotte and Ian stops him but crashes the car. After learning what happened, Ian's stepfather tells him he's proud of him. Teenage girl Esther collapses and Mike and Eddie learn she has recently given birth; her strictly religious parents (Celia Imrie and Sam Kelly) kept her out of sex education class. After Charlie and Jude support her, she takes Josh and Liz to where she hid the healthy baby boy but her parents disown her, meaning they will both have to be taken into care. Emma puts an end to her and Adam's attempt at a reconciliation, while Mike and Rachel elect to be just friends.
144	16	"Stitching the Surface"	Jane Perry	Gillian Richmond	28 January 1995	—
A schoolgirl tries to run away from home but runs into a luggage trolley when a man spooks her. She refuses to go with her father when he comes to the hospital and tells Kate he is abusing her. Her mother reveals she made a similar claim before and the girl withdraws the allegation, but Kate realises she was telling the truth and the mother is forced to accept it. Matt decides not to give evidence in Ash's defence when his family get a brick through their window. An elderly woman (Jean Heywood) is brought in by a neighbour (Martina Laird) after falling down some stairs but Eddie and Rachel discover old bruises. She admits her son hits her but doesn't want to report him because she doesn't want to be left alone; Eddie reports him anyway. A pensioner (George A. Cooper) tries to gas himself in his garage and is saved by a neighbour. His daughter (Cheryl Hall) is unsympathetic, telling Charlie he beat her and her mother and feeling it is just a ploy: She is proved right when the neighbour reveals he was expecting him round earlier.
145	17	"Heartbreak Hotel"	Chris Clough	Rob Gittins	4 February 1995	—
Mike and Rachel have resumed their relationship. Matt tries to break up a dispute between his parents, Brian and Joan, but Joan ends up throwing boiling milk over Brian. Matt convinces her to get help from Social Services. He then has to explain to Ash why he can't give evidence. During a prison riot, a prisoner (Ray Winstone) whose wife has just told him she is leaving him deliberately injures himself so he can go to hospital. A guard (Tony Selby) who is about to retire lets him slip away after he promises to come back; he finds his wife has a new boyfriend and is stabbed by him during a fight. His wife decides to stay with him. The guard has been having an affair with the governor's secretary (Cindy O'Callaghan) and plans to leave his wife (Rosemary Martin); when his wife finds out, she accepts the separation without putting up a fight.
146	18	"Trial and Tribulations"	Ian White	Lilie Ferrari	11 February 1995	—
It is Ash's day in court; Mike has gone to represent the staff and Charlie and Eddie are due to give evidence. A pregnant woman (Tessa Peake-Jones) goes to see her husband, who is organising a protest against a road widening scheme, but is hit by a construction vehicle. Her husband, a former doctor who once worked with Charlie, saves a worker from choking. His wife feels he puts his protests ahead of their marriage and won't let him come home. Jude meets with a friend of hers; she is his support "buddy" and he has AIDS. He is beaten in a homophobic attack and Jude helps work things out between him and his boyfriend (Ben Miller). When Matt voices his view that he should report it, Jude criticises him for not helping Ash. Matt tells the court what he witnesses and Ash is acquitted.
147	19	"Out of Time"	Chris Lovett	David Joss Buckley	18 February 1995	—
An ageing former actress and model (Annabel Leventon) undergoes a cosmetic procedure which leaves her with infected wounds on her legs. Her daughter assumes that her photographer father has been having an affair; in fact, the mother has. A widow working as a lorry driver takes her baby daughter in the cab with her. She crashes because of an overtaking car; she is taken to hospital but it is some time before the baby is retrieved from the lorry unharmed. Ash clashes with Eddie on his first day back at work and tells Charlie he is considering taking up a lecturer's job. Eddie learns she has passed her exams. Rachel encourages Mike to attempt a reconciliation with his wife.
148	20	"Branded"	Diana Patrick	Billy Hamon	25 February 1995	—
Both Mike and Ash are taking temporary leave. Mike's replacement is Barbara Hayes, who turns out to be Charlie's former lover Baz. A post-op transsexual, Audrey (John Duttine), visits her younger friend Sarah (Lucy Davis) at a mall. Thugs try to mug Audrey and Sarah is pushed through a window. She has internal bleeding but is a Jehovah's Witness and refuses a blood transfusion or surgery. Audrey turns out to be her father; both Sarah's parents (her mother is played by Mel Martin) try to talk her round, as does Eddie, but she dies. A single mother (Mossie Smith) with five children turns up: Several of them have injuries and Kate is suspicious. The children initially claims their mother beats them but it eventually turns out the eldest girl framed her so they would be taken away, fed up of having to look after her younger siblings. The children are taken into care.
149	21	"Exiles"	Tony McHale	Tony McHale	4 March 1995	—
A college student collapses and the staff are informed that her boyfriend died recently; Eddie realises she has Guillain–Barré syndrome. An ice hockey player worries when his estranged wife appears; he is injured during a clash on the rink and his wife tries to take their son back to Canada in the confusion. She tells Rachel that her husband disappeared with their son while she was recovering from alcoholism; he agrees to quit the sport and attempt to reconcile with her. A young runaway couple try to rob an off licence but are disturbed by customers and the man is impaled on a fence. His girlfriend rings the hospital for help and Charlie eventually manages to win her trust and arrange to pick them up for Josh and Liz. The police have asked the hospital to look out for the couple, meaning they are arrested, but she is still grateful to Charlie. Charlie confides in Kate about his history with Baz.
150	22	"Nobody's Perfect" (Note: See also "Nobody's Perfect" series 16 & "Nobody's Perfect" series 20)	Geoff Feld	Lisa Evans	11 March 1995	—
When a pilot is delayed in town, his wife takes a businessman on a trip. She collapses on return and the passenger dies of his injuries; it turns out she is epileptic but she and her husband have been unable to face it. Liz tells Josh her husband wants children; he tells her he can't imagine not having his children but starting a family ended his wife's career. A middle-aged woman (Judy Loe) goes to an abortion clinic but turns back when she sees a group of protestors outside and ends up collapsing at the hospital. She had an abortion but picked up an infection; her younger boyfriend is disappointed but supportive, but the leader of the protestors turns out to be her son (Charlie Condou) and disowns her. A woman (Patricia Brake) is found in a skip and tells the staff her daughter is getting married. Her husband reveals she turned to drink after their daughter was killed in a car accident but takes her away before Rachel and Jude can arrange counselling for her.
151	23	"Not Waving But Drowning" (Note: See also "Not Waving But Drowning" series 14 & "Waving Not Drowning" series 16)	Michael Owen Morris	Ashley Pharoah	18 March 1995	—
A hotel owner (Edward Peel) organises a press conference with his wife (Louise Jameson) to refute claims the sea is polluted; his daughter (Lisa Faulkner), who is friends with the local surfers, disagrees so he locks her in the house. Her boyfriend reveals he has chemical burns from when they went surfing earlier and she is found in severe pain. The lorry driver who dumped toxic chemicals in the sea, who is estranged from his wife (Shirin Taylor) and struggling with limited access to his daughter, takes his daughter to hospital when she gets some of the chemicals on her hands; when he sees the damage he has done, he gives the staff full details and turns himself in to the police. Liz decides against children but is left feeling broody when she and Josh rescue a boy who has got trapped in a dishwasher. Matt is attacked by Hitchens and a henchman on the way home but claims he was mugged; Jude realizes the truth but keeps quiet when he tells her the matter is closed and they share a kiss when she gives him a ride home. Charlie agrees to have dinner with Baz and her husband Peter.
152	24	"Duty of Care" (Note: See also "Duty of Care" series 25 & "Duty of Care" series 26)	David Innes Edwards	Andrew Holden	25 March 1995	16.75
A farmer is arguing with her daughter, who is moving away, when her legs are mangled by farm machinery as she tries to clear an obstruction. Josh and Liz are called in and the woman refuses amputation, but when she loses consciousness a surgeon amputates anyway. It transpires she is selling the farm to one of her workers. Jude is disappointed to find Matt chatting up an agency nurse while Charlie is annoyed to discover Baz has actually invited him to a large dinner party. A patient, Henry Turner, turns out to have a primed explosive strapped to him and demands information on a patient from a few months previous. The department is evacuated and the police have Baz talk to Henry over the phone: The patient was his mother, who died in a corridor on her own of a stroke while he was in jail for arson. Henry blows himself up. Charlie takes Baz back to his place instead of to the dinner party, where they kiss.

== Bibliography ==
- Kingsley, Hilary (1995). Casualty: The Inside Story. Penguin Books. ISBN 0-14-024902-8.
