= John Gittins =

John Gittins may refer to:

- Jack Gittins (1893–1956), English footballer
- John C. Gittins (born 1938), researcher and professor
