= Gettins =

Gettins is a surname. Notable people with the surname include:

- Alfred Gettins (1886–1949), English footballer
- Eddie Gettins (1883–1925), English footballer
- Joseph Gettins (1873–1954), English footballer

== See also ==
- Gittens, surname
- Gittins, surname
