= Casualty series 16 =

Sixteenth series of Casualty

Casualty
- Series 16
- Starring: Jan Anderson; Adjoa Andoh; Ian Bleasdale; Louise Brealey; Christopher Colquhoun; Robert Gwilym; Kelly Harrison; Ben Keaton; Ian Kelsey; Kwame Kwei-Armah; Martina Laird; Judy Loe; Simon MacCorkindale; Will Mellor; Dan Rymer; Zita Sattar; Cathy Shipton; Christine Stephen-Daly; Derek Thompson; Lee Warburton
- No. of episodes: 40

Release
- Original network: BBC One
- Original release: 15 September 2001 – 29 June 2002

Series chronology
- ← Previous; Series 15 Next → Series 17

The sixteenth series of the British medical drama television series Casualty commenced airing in the United Kingdom on BBC One on 15 September 2001 and finished on 29 June 2002.

== Production ==
Mervyn Watson, who had previously worked on Coronation Street and Emmerdale took over from Rachel Wright as producer for this series.

The episode count increased this series, this time to 40 episodes. The Controller of Continuing Drama Series, Mal Young, commented the decision to increase the show's airtime was in response to viewer feedback. "We were receiving complaints when it was off air, so we've decided to give viewers more of what they want." The departure of several characters from the end of the previous series seemed bold but paved the way for new faces. Young stated "We've done everything possible with those characters and I wanted to move on." Watson added "We've said goodbye to five or six people and said hello to an equal number." The aim was to increase the pace of the series by creating more dynamic character storylines to avoid it from becoming repetitive.

The opening episode "Holding the Baby", features an ambulance crashing into a car before dangling perilously over a railway line. The scenes were shot at the Great Central Railway in Loughborough over several days in late March 2001.

On 30 March 2002, "Hearts and Minds" (episode 30) had to be shown on BBC Two, due to some schedule changes on BBC One resulting from the death of Queen Elizabeth The Queen Mother earlier that day.

== Cast ==
=== Overview ===
The sixteenth series of Casualty features a cast of characters working in the emergency department of Holby City Hospital and Holby Ambulance Service. Eleven cast members from the previous series reprise their roles in this series.

Robert Gwilym stars as emergency medicine consultant and clinical director Max Gallagher and Ian Kelsey as specialist registrar in emergency medicine Patrick Spiller. Derek Thompson continues his role as charge nurse Charlie Fairhead, Cathy Shipton as Lisa "Duffy" Duffin, as sister and Adjoa Andoh as senior staff nurse Colette Kierney. Jan Anderson and Zita Sattar continue as staff nurses Chloe Hill and Anna Paul.

Ian Bleasdale and Kwame Kwei-Armah continue their role as paramedics Josh Griffiths and Finlay Newton. Will Mellor stars as receptionist Jack Vincent and Ben Keaton continues as porter Spencer.

Dan Rymer joins the team in episode 1 as staff nurse Dillon Cahill, alongside Kelly Harrison as ambulance technician Nikki Marshall and Martina Laird as paramedic Comfort Jones. Christine Stephen-Daly and Judy Loe arrive in episode 3 as senior house officer Lara Stone and chief executive Jan Goddard. Lee Warburton joins in episode 11 as receptionist Jack's brother, security guard Tony Vincent.

Anderson departs in episode 20, whilst Kelsey leaves the series in episode 28 after his character Patrick dies due to a head injury. He is replaced by Christopher Colquhoun arriving in episode 29 as specialist registrar Simon Kaminski. Louise Brealey joins the cast in episode 32 as student nurse Roxanne Bird. Gwilym departed in episode 36 with accomplished actor Simon MacCorkindale arriving as emergency medicine consultant and clinical director Harry Harper in episode 37. Gwilym states his decision to leave the series was a "mutual one" adding "After four years in Casualty it felt like it had been enough…". Keaton departs at the end of the series.

The series features several recurring characters. Janet Dibley stars as Amanda Lewis, Max Gallagher's girlfriend, Chad Shepherd as Rob Jones, Comfort's husband and Henry Ian Cusick as Jason, Chloe's troublesome boyfriend. Amy Robbins appears as police officer Rachel James who becomes romantically involved with Patrick whilst Emily Dormer stars as receptionist Gilly, Spencer's irksome daughter. Bob Mason appears as paramedic officer Jeff McGuire.

=== Main characters ===
- Jan Anderson as Chloe Hill (until episode 20)
- Adjoa Andoh as Colette Griffiths
- Ian Bleasdale as Josh Griffiths
- Louise Brealey as Roxanne "Roxy" Bird (from episode 32)
- Christopher Colquhoun as Simon Kaminski (from episode 29)
- Robert Gwilym as Max Gallagher (until episode 36)
- Kelly Harrison as Nikki Marshall (from episode 1)
- Ben Keaton as Spencer (until episode 40)
- Ian Kelsey as Patrick Spiller (until episode 28)
- Kwame Kwei-Armah as Finlay Newton
- Martina Laird as Comfort Jones (from episode 1)
- Judy Loe as Jan Goddard (episodes 3–40)
- Simon MacCorkindale as Harry Harper (from episode 37)
- Will Mellor as Jack Vincent
- Dan Rymer as Dillon Cahill (from episode 1)
- Zita Sattar as Anna Paul
- Cathy Shipton as Lisa "Duffy" Duffin
- Christine Stephen-Daly as Lara Stone (from episode 3)
- Derek Thompson as Charlie Fairhead
- Lee Warburton as Tony Vincent (from episode 11)

=== Recurring characters ===
- Ben Alsford as Peter Bower (episodes 1–21)
- Arthur Caulfield as Ben Lewis (episodes 3–12)
- Scott Cowan as Jake Bower (episodes 1–21)
- Henry Ian Cusick as Jason (episodes 3–18)
- Janet Dibley as Amanda Lewis (until episode 12)
- Emily Dormer as Gilly (episodes 24–30)
- Bob Mason as Jeff McGuire (episodes 1–9 and 30)
- Lisa Palfrey as Melanie Collier (from episode 37)
- Amy Robbins as Rachel James (episodes 1–15)
- Chad Shepherd as Rob Jones (episodes 4–35)

=== Guest characters ===
- Christine Adams as Melanie Phillips (episode 21)
- Frankie Carson as Jordan Harper (episode 37)
- Chrissie Cotterill as Shirley (episodes 12 and 14)
- Tom Fisher as Al (episodes 4 and 16)
- Natalie Glover as Emma Davies (episode 36)
- Fiona Gillies as Philippa Kinross (episodes 14–19)
- Dorian Healy as David Collier (episodes 37–40)
- George Irving as Anton Meyer (episode 39)
- Sheena Irving as Gemma Harvey (episodes 25–27)
- Danny McCall as Greg James (episodes 15 and 16)
- Ashley Miller as WPC Paula Newcombe (episodes 16–38)
- Michael Praed as Chris Meredith (from episode 32)
- Melissa Pryer as Liza Davies (episode 36)
- Tarek Ramini as PC Russell (episodes 4–21)
- Griff Rhys Jones as Paul Fuller (episode 35)
- Tracey Saunders as Lynn Oldfield (episodes 2–7)
- Christopher Scoular as Philip Greenwood (episodes 3 and 8)
- Morag Siller as Leona (episode 10)
- Gillian Taylforth as Justine Walker MP (episodes 33–34)
- Charis Thomas as Natalie McKay (episodes 2 and 14–15)
- Nick Tizzard as PC McCormack (episode 40)
- Oliver Trestain as Kenny Wilson (episodes 1 and 6)

== Episodes ==
No. overall	No. in series	Title	Directed by	Written by	Original release date	UK viewers (millions)
321	1	"Holding the Baby"	Adrian Bean	Stephen McAteer	15 September 2001	8.98
Josh and Fin are taking ambulance technician Nikki Marshall out on her first day. Answering a report of a heart attack, Josh goes through a red light and collides with a car containing four youths. The ambulance ends up suspended off a bridge with Josh and Fin trapped inside. Nikki speaks with Danny, a youth from the other car, who then wanders off. Chloe is now sharing a flat with Anna; despite selling her house boat, she has been left £7,000 in debt. Patrick has just passed his consultant's exam and reminds Max they need a replacement for Holly. He and nurse Dillon Cahill are sent to the accident scene where Dillon finds Danny wandering in a dazed state. The fire crew get Josh and Fin out just before the ambulance goes over the bridge. Motorcycle paramedic Comfort Jones answers their original shout and is frustrated to find that a group of stags set the groom up with a cross-dressing stripper, who he ended up in a fight with before collapsing. Charlie goes to see Duffy who goes into labour. She refuses to go to the hospital where Andrew died so Charlie has to deliver the baby boy at home and resuscitate him when he gets strangled by the cord, although he convinces her to go to hospital afterwards. Police sergeant Rachel James arrives to investigate the crash and turns out to be having an affair with Patrick; she is married. Nikki believes Josh was going too fast and a witness has said the same but everyone advises her to keep quiet. Josh accuses Danny of being a joyrider but he says it was a present for signing with a local football team. He then dies of an intercranial bleed. Paramedic supervisor Jeff McGuire tells Rachel that Josh may have been going too fast. Guest starring Rachel Bavidge, Shelley Miranda Barrett and Noel Clarke Ambulance Technician, Nikki Marshall, Paramedic, Comfort Jones, Paramedic Duty Manager Jeff McGuire, Staff Nurse, Dillon Cahill and policewoman, Rachel James are introduced.
322	2	"Dirty Laundry"	Paul Duane	Clive Dawson and Stephen McAteer	22 September 2001	8.41
Josh, Fin and Nikki are all interviewed by Rachel, with the latter two forced to admit they thought Josh was going too fast. McGuire suspends Josh from driving and sends him to the ED for a medical. Danny's sister Lynn turns up and Charlie arranges for her to view his body. She thanks Josh for trying to save him before Max tells her what happened. Chloe decides to get a second job to pay off her debts while the number of women Dillon knows gets mixed reaction from the staff. Natalie visits Colette to say she is pregnant; however, it has made her understand Colette giving her up even less and she wants no further contact. Patrick hears about Holly's replacement, Lara Stone, who is currently working in Sierra Leone. A man experiences chest pains on a flight and Patrick realises he has decompression syndrome from going diving on holiday. He was living a more active life to impress a stewardess he was having a fling with but it turns out she isn't interested in him anyway. Jack arranges a date with Delight, the transvestite stripper from the previous week, but soon realises the truth. Fin drives slowly to a mugging and the victim bleeds out in the time it takes to get there. McGuire tells all staff to exercise caution, annoying him. He and Comfort are then called to a building site; a man has had a panic attack up on the gantry after seeing a friend nearly fall and Fin climbs up to reassure him, saying they both need to stand up to their bosses. Guest starring Noel Clarke, Harold Finlay and Lucy Blakely
323	3	"All's Fair" (Note: See also "All's Fair" series 5, "All's Fair" series 10 & "All's Fair in Love and War" series 20)	Paul Wroblewski	David Lane	29 September 2001	8.29
A motorcyclist holds up a service station and shoots the cashier when he is unable to open the safe. The cashier dies in hospital. The robber also ends up in hospital after crashing when he swerved to avoid a child; Dillon finds the money on him and Rachel charges him with murder. Josh saves his life by removing his helmet in a risky move, leaving Nikki more understanding of his decisions. Trust manager Philip Greenwood arranges a photoshoot to mark Lara Stone's arrival but she ends up assaulting the photographer when he ends up getting in the way of her treating a patient. A mother asks her former husband to look after their son while she goes on a date and later has an allergic reaction, even though she is only allergic to horses. She is later brought back in after another reaction and Patrick and Chloe discover her former husband planted horse hair on her to spoil her new relationship. Charlie tells him he may be charged and advises him to get psychiatric help. Max and Amanda take Ben out for his birthday; he has left college and agrees to move in with them, despite mistrusting Max. Max finds Chloe working as a waitress at the restaurant, run by a man named Jason, and warns her not to be too tired to work. Charlie goes to a supper club and gets on well with Jan Goddard. Next day, he learns she is the new hospital CEO and she advises him to go for the clinical nurse specialist job. Guest starring Joanna Monro, Ricardo Montez and Mark Powley Chief Executive Officer, Jan Goddard and SHO, Lara Stone are introduced.
324	4	"Crash Course"	Tim Leandro	Paul Cornell	6 October 2001	8.48
Nikki and Comfort are doing a shift together. One of their first patients is Al, a psychiatric case well known to Comfort who has cut off his ear. They are called out to a building site where a collapse has left nine injured. Comfort quickly dismisses several of them as beyond help and they get three to hospital but two of them die; one of them had a pacemaker that masked internal bleeding. The ambulance is also bugged by a group of students making hoax calls so they can film the ambulance; Comfort reports them to the college. They collect a priest who has cancer that he has left untreated. He confesses to Comfort that he abused a girl who used to help clear up after services and she tells Patrick not to try too hard with him, which Nikki sees as another example of her deciding who lives and who dies; the priest dies in Resus. Nikki considers quitting but rallies after saving an old man who had a heart attack at the British Legion. Nikki goes out for a drink with PC Russell and his friends while Comfort, seeming unaffected throughout the day, breaks down in tears watching a sad film with her husband Rob. Guest starring Glynn Sweet, Trevor Dwyer-Lynch and John Breslin
325	5	"Bringing Up Baby"	Sue Dunderdale	Dan Sefton	13 October 2001	8.77
Patrick is due to have his consultant's interview with an old colleague of Max's, who has rung Max for a reference. Duffy calls in with baby Paul and Charlie tells her about his application. A pregnant woman is brought in after a car accident which has caused the placenta to become detached. She needs an emergency caesarean and, with no-one more experienced available, Lara ends up doing it despite not being qualified. The woman's husband, a midwife, lodges a complaint for the break in procedure but changes his mind after seeing they are both all right. Charlie initially criticises Lara and Dillon for the incident before worrying he is becoming too corporate. Anna and Ben move in with Max. A teenage babysitter brings in a crying baby. He has old bruises, indicating abuse, but also has meningitis. The babysitter fears she will be blamed and runs off with him but Patrick and Spencer find her and convince her to give him back. Chloe is convinced the girl is guilty until it turns out that was the first day she had looked after the baby; suspicion thus falls on the mother and Patrick notes that if he survives he'll likely end up in foster care. Patrick learns he didn't get the job and thinks Max is to blame. Guest starring Charles Kay, Tamara Ustinov and Paul Wyett
326	6	"White Lies"	Reza Moradi	Peter Mills	20 October 2001	8.95
A race car driver crashes his car into a tree and Patrick recalls he has been off his form recently. His father wants him to keep racing but Lara notes he has symptoms of RSD and convinces his father he should quit. She tells Patrick she knows the driver is faking it but has lost his nerve and will probably be killed if he races again. Max thinks Patrick's lack of people skills show he isn't ready to be a consultant. Max loses £50 from his wallet and thinks Ben took it but Colette tells him he dropped it in Resus. A teenage girl is dumped at the hospital with a heroin overdose. She is upset about her father's recent death and the fact her mother is already planning to remarry. Colette convinces her mother to stand by her. Jack and a wheelchair-using friend fine drivers who are misusing the car park's disabled spaces, intending to donate the money to charity. Anna patches up a pantomime horse taking part in a fun run. It is the day of Danny's inquest. Lynn and Kevin both make statements criticising the ambulance and Nikki admits she thought Josh was going too fast but Comfort encourages Fin to lie and he supports Josh. Josh admits he was at fault but the jury returns a majority verdict of accidental death. McGuire considers it a result but Josh tells him he is resigning. Guest starring Noel Clarke, Steven Duffy and Felix Dexter
327	7	"Facing the Future"	Nic Phillips	Jo O'Keefe	27 October 2001	7.97
Chloe arrives at work tired having spent the night with Jason. She falls asleep and leaves some drugs in the staff room. Anna tries to cover for her but Charlie and Colette find out and the pair are given a warning. A woman is brought in with a bruised face; she claims she fell down some stairs but Comfort tells Colette the neighbours say she and her boyfriend often argued. Colette refuses to let her leave without knowing the truth only for the woman's boyfriend to die in Resus after it turns out she stabbed him; she says it was the first time he fought back. A plastic surgeon comes in as a patient with stomach ulcers. He reveals he was at medical school with Dillon who dropped out but Dillon tells him he's happy with his life. A teenage girl impales her neck on a railing while teaching a friend to rollerblade and Nikki has to keep her calm while the fire brigade cut her free. Josh and Fin watch Danny's funeral from a distance after which Lynn tells Josh to get on with his life. Ben comes in with a cut hand and Max personally sees to him. Patrick arranges to go to a party with Lara but Dillon tells her cancelled a date with Rachel to see her so she arranges to be called away from a liaison and leave him hanging. Guest starring Matthew Cross, Rosie Cavaliero and Jonie Broom
328	8	"For My Next Trick"	Paul Wroblewski	Rachel Gretton and Vicky Cleaver	3 November 2001	8.27
Charlie has arranged for a film crew to shoot a promotional video on Bonfire Night but it is called off when the presenter collapses in Resus; she had been taking slimming pills without a prescription. Patrick tries to ask her out but Lara has told her he is married with children. He tells Dillon Rachel is married and asks him to keep quiet. A taxi driver is taking a young soldier to his first posting but drives out in front of a lorry, causing a collision. The driver has a dislocated shoulder but the soldier has spinal injuries and may never walk again. Duffy realises the driver has no peripheral vision; he has had a stroke and kept driving despite the loss of sight. Two traditional rivals, Dave and Jez, are putting on a joint fireworks display but youths set off the centrepiece early. Jez cobbles together a replacement but when his wife Fi lights it, it goes off on the ground. Dave shields her from the blast and is badly burned; Jez may be charged with tampering with fireworks. Jason asks Chloe to be the hostess of his new club and she agrees. A magician comes in after burning his hand on dry ice and Jack borrows his jacket for Charlie, who is giving a speech at a charity dinner. He comments about understaffing, annoying Jan although she still asks him back to hers. Max finds drugs in Ben's pocket and Ben asks him for morphine. Max steals some drugs but doesn't pass them on to Ben. Guest starring Paul Kynman, Garron Mitchell and Jay Byrd
329	9	"Distant Elephants"	Paul Duane	Leslie Stewart	10 November 2001	9.10
Nikki and Comfort bring in a young man injured in a knife fight; his girlfriend is worried about her parents finding out she was with him. Comfort has a minor leg wound after being cut with the same knife and needs to stay at the hospital to be tested for HIV and hepatitis. She failed to be immunised as per procedure. Nikki finds herself paired with McGuire who messes up on two shouts, a cyclist with a head injury and an elderly woman with a suspected heart attack. Josh is on leave while serving out his notice and helps a young woman, Jo, fix her car before going to hand in his uniform. McGuire convinces him to replace him on the shift. Comfort's tests come back clear but she is restricted to driving until a second test in three months. Jo drives her car into a lake and is found by Josh and Nikki. Patrick and Colette arrive but can do nothing except offer pain relief and Josh sits with Jo as she dies. Afterwards, he decides to return to work. Guest starring Max Wrottesley, Jill Cooper and Louisa Milwood-Haigh
330	10	"It's a Family Affair"	Adrian Bean	Chris Webb	17 November 2001	8.76
Leona brings in her daughter and it turns out she has been keeping her too warm. Duffy, who has just returned from maternity leave, chides Charlie for mollycoddling her. An elderly woman is brought in with facial injuries and says she was head-butted by someone who is in her barn; it turns out to be a goat. A man is called in to work on his daughter's birthday and accidentally runs her over after arguing with his wife. The couple come to blows at the hospital but Spencer gets them talking and the man offers to give up his job. A farmer fails to secure his shotgun properly when his young son nearly knocks a pan of hot milk over. The boy later gets hold of the gun and playfully shoots his mother with it. She dies in Crash and both father and son are taken to the police station for questioning. Charlie placates a man left waiting for hours with a cut finger and Jan overhears him criticising management. Jason asks Chloe to entertain a business associate and she is concerned when he implies they are involved in illegal activity. Max gives Amanda earrings for her birthday and they get engaged. Ben again asks him for drugs. Max orders extra methadone from the pharmacy and shuts down Patrick when he queries it. Unknown to him, Ben has already stolen Amanda's earrings and some money to buy more drugs and turns down the methadone Max offers him. Guest starring Nigel Clauzel, Bob Barrett and Bernard Holley
331	11	"The Morning After"	Sue Dunderdale	Edel Brosnan	24 November 2001	7.71
Jack's brother Tony turns up with a boxing injury; Anna and Chloe are taken with him but are unaware that he is gay and has been in prison. A patient's husband attacks Spencer after being frustrated by a pay phone and Jack and Tony have to step in. Charlie convinces Jan to have a permanent security presence in the department but in the process lets slip about their relationship; Duffy is upset that Charlie didn't tell her. A woman falls down an escalator while looking for her young daughter and turns out to be losing her eyesight. She tries to break up with her husband but he suggests they travel the world together. A teenage girl comes in claiming she is older than she is; she and her older sister have eczema but their mother, who was addicted to prescription drugs, refuses to let her use conventional treatment. Dillon convinces Lara to give her some cream and arranges a referral. Josh and Fin find Ben collapsed from a heroin overdose and he insists they take him to hospital. Max refuses to give him drugs but Amanda is annoyed that Max kept the fact he had relapsed from her and breaks off the engagement. Patrick realises Max ordered the methadone for a private rehab plan for Ben. Charlie tries to cover for Max but Patrick reports him to Jan. Guest starring Ben Thomas, Bridgitta Roy and Zoe Thorne Tony Vincent is introduced.
332	12	"Best Intentions"	Reza Moradi	Maurice Bessman	1 December 2001	7.88
Max and Amanda take Ben to a rehab clinic but Amanda maintains their relationship is over. Jack convinces Tony to apply for a security guard job at the department and Charlie agrees to support him. A man is brought in after leaving a cut leg untreated for a week, allowing it to become infected. He refuses antibiotics and seems happy to have it amputated. Max realises he has dysmorphia and he and Lara authorise an amputation. A teenage girl comes in with appendicitis but her parents refuses to consent to an operation since their son died during a routine procedure. The girl ends up giving consent herself. A referee at a women's rugby match disallows a legitimate try in which an opposing player was injured, resulting in the scorer punching him. It turns out the scorer is his wife and the injured player is his former wife who he wants to get back with: The two women team up to report him. Dillon catches Spencer throwing up and he later vomits blood in reception. Jack tracks down Spencer's estranged wife Shirley, who is impressed at how he's turning his life around. However, despite Patrick and Colette disagreeing, Dillon tells Shirley the condition might be down to alcohol abuse and she leaves. It later turns out he tore his oesophagus after throwing up from food poisoning. Charlie tries to hide Max from Jan but she eventually tells him he's suspended pending investigation. Jason asks Chloe to entertain a client, Lenny, but she has to work so sends Anna in her place. Anna is unnerved by Lenny and, on learning she isn't Chloe, he considers her available, following and assaulting her. Guest starring Huw Higginson, Eddie Osei and Nick Miles
333	13	"Someone to Watch Over Me"	Nic Phillips	Ann Marie Di Mambro	8 December 2001	8.42
Anna returns home badly beaten and calls Chloe to let her know what happened. She goes into work against advice and claims she fell down the stairs in a night club but collapses while doing triage and is rushed to theatre with internal bleeding. Both Anna and Jason are reluctant to involve the police; Jason tells Chloe he is a smuggler and will give Anna compensation and make sure Lenny is punished quietly. Dillon is working a shift at the Samaritans and gets talking to a student who has taken an overdose. He stays on the phone with him until he agrees to an ambulance being sent; Charlie chides him when he turns up late but later makes the connection. The student is saved but his father, who pressured him to study medicine, is reluctant to accept what has happened and has to be restrained from attacking Colette when she shows him the suicide note. Susan, an old friend of Duffy's, does an agency shift and recommends it to her, saying it's more money and less politics. Charlie lets Max into the department to clear his office without getting permission from Jan. A DJ comes in having caught himself in his fly zip; Lara and Duffy sort him out but learn he is going deaf from loud music and advise him to give up work, causing him to react badly when Jack tries to give him a demo tape. Josh asks Colette to marry him and she says yes. Guest starring David Birkin, Rory Hannah and John Bowler
334	14	"Happily Ever After"	Ian White	Ginnie Hole	15 December 2001	8.64
The staff throws impromptu stag and hen parties for Josh and Colette on the eve of their wedding. A woman at a nearby table argues with her older husband. She later drives off after an argument and crashes her car into a tree; the police suspect she was drink driving. Patrick, Dillon and Lara discover evidence of old injuries and realise her husband is abusing her. Dillon convinces Lara to admit her but locum consultant Philippa Kinross believes her husband's claim that she is a drunk and discharges her. Dillon smuggles her to a women's refuge and her husband is arrested after blaming Philippa and hitting her. A girl is brought in by her father, who has served time in jail for armed robbery and has a history of alcohol abuse, having had an allergic reaction. Philippa dismisses the father's version of events but Chloe deduces she is allergic to latex and kissed an inflatable reindeer. Anna wants to tell Charlie the truth about her assault but Jason is worried his smuggling will come out. Chloe offers to break up with Jason in return for Anna's silence, but instead keeps seeing him in secret. Tony has his first shift as security guard and Spencer returns home to find Shirley waiting for him. Patrick and Rachel exchange gifts; his is an expensive watch and he realises Rachel likes him more than he does her. Josh arranges for Natalie to visit Colette before the wedding. She goes into labour and gives birth in the back of an ambulance but then starts haemorrhaging. Josh and Colette keep a vigil over her in intensive care. Guest starring Patsy Kensit, David Hounslow and Sean Sloan Philippa Kinross is introduced.
335	15	"Life and Soul"	Jim O'Hanlon	Andrew Rattenbury and Katharine Way	22 December 2001	8.47
Natalie's adopted mother Sue turns up at the hospital and clashes with Colette but Natalie, recovering, asks them to get on. Fin, Chloe, Jack and Tony try to arrange for Josh and Colette to get married at the hospital before their honeymoon but the hospital chaplain is delayed. Duffy asks a reverend who has been bothering people in reception, being punched by an irate husband, to stand in but his wife reveals he isn't a real vicar. The chaplain turns up in time and the marriage goes ahead. A junior lawyer is humiliated by his boss at a Christmas party. He gets drunk and falls off a bridge, getting impaled on railings. Patrick leads a team who cut him out and he tells his boss he is going to sue him for harassment, with a colleague backing him up. Scott, a boy in Jake's class, comes in after being pushed off the stage during a Nativity. His mother Margaret tells Duffy that Jake pushed him; Jake explains that Scott said Andrew was in hell because he was murdered. Patrick is uncomfortable that Rachel wants to leave her husband Greg for him but later leaves her a message saying he loves her. Rachel chases after a mugger but is set upon with a metal bar and badly injured. In hospital, it turns out she is a few weeks pregnant, even though Greg has been away for months. She dies in Resus and Greg walks in on Patrick saying goodbye to her. Guest starring Sarah Haye, Kim Oliver, Ivan Kaye and Sylvester McCoy Death of Policewoman, Rachel James
336	16	"Consequences"	Adrian Bean	Stuart Morris	26 December 2001	7.53
Greg attacks Patrick in Resus on learning what's going on and is ejected by Dillon, Jack and Tony. Charlie wants to press charges but Jan and DI Spalding, who is cynical about Patrick's relationship with Rachel, want the matter hushed up to avoid bad publicity. Nikki and Comfort are called to a pub where Al has locked himself in the toilet and their attempts to calm him are hampered by a group of abusive Holby United fans. A bus full of Holby City fans crashes into the pub and the head lout is impaled on a pool cue. Patrick leads a medical team to treat the various casualties and Al points out the lout can be freed simply by unscrewing the cue. The bus driver turns out to have had a blackout caused by an irregular heartbeat and Lara ignores Philippa's orders to shock him back into rhythm. Three young women on holiday turn up: They are trying to cheer up one of their number, Liz, after a break-up but another, Karen, has started throwing up. Liz gets drunk on vodka after Karen admits to sleeping with her ex and also throws up. Al helps Lara realise that a mushroom the girls ate reacts badly with alcohol; Liz and Karen decide to keep quiet when friend Sandra (who probably slept with him as well) arranges to go for a drink with Jack. Lara convinces Patrick to come with her to a cottage where she is spending New Year with friends, but while she is in the bath Greg turns up and chases Patrick through the woods to a pond where he starts drowning him. Guest starring Philip Wright, James Smith and Beth Cordingly
337	17	"Playing with Fire"	Graham Wetherell	Patrick Melanaphy	29 December 2001	9.57
Lara and Spalding find Patrick near the pond the next morning, suffering from hypothermia. Nikki and Comfort collect him but Lara stays at the cottage with her boyfriend Craig. Max tries to help out with Patrick but Philippa and Jan order him out. Charlie criticises Jan for letting Greg go and Philippa for snapping at Chloe. Two teenagers steal a bag from a man's car and he is run over while chasing them. The bag turns out to contain a snake which bites one of the thieves. His friend takes him to hospital and eventually tells Charlie the truth, allowing him to find out the type of snake from the owner and get the right anti-venom. The thief is arrested. A youth takes his younger girlfriend out drinking with his friends and tries to stop her drinking alcohol. When he takes her home, she is apparently drunk and her father punches him. Tony breaks up a fight at the hospital and the boy insists she wasn't drinking. Philippa realises she is diabetic and the father lets her boyfriend in to see her. The foreman at Jason's warehouse is impaled on broken glass when a crate collapses on him. Jason refuses to take him to hospital and instead calls Chloe to treat him. Anna discovers Chloe and Jason are still together. Nikki goes out for dinner with Jack and suggests they go back to his place afterwards. Lara breaks up with Craig and sits by Patrick's bedside until he recovers. Guest starring Richard Armitage, Philip Wright and Steve Bennett
338	18	"Checking In, Checking Out"	Reza Moradi	Dan Sefton	5 January 2002	8.76
Colette returns from honeymoon and learns that her photographs haven't come out. Jack is uncomfortable that Nikki lost her virginity to him and tries to end it, but later surprises her in Resus with flowers to apologise. Anna asks Tony out and learns he is gay. When she finds he is acquainted with a gay drug addict who is brought in, she makes assumptions about his lifestyle but later realises her mistake and apologises. A man with terminal cancer collapses in the street. His oncologist wants to press ahead with chemotherapy but he feels it will only ruin the time he has left. Lara convinces him to speak out. A homeless man is bought in with frostbite and the staff warm him up. Philippa is happy to let him discharge himself but Dillon convinces him to get admitted, saying he'll get time in a hospital bed and be arranged a hostel when he's discharged. A prisoner, Lewis, is brought in with facial injuries: He is serving time for the manslaughter of a Customs officer. In fact, he is Jason's brother. He fakes a cerebral bleed to get a CT scan, at which point Jason locks Lara and the guards in the observation room so he can escape. They ask Chloe to help them get out of the building and she does, unaware they are on CCTV. Guest starring Derek Riddell, Ken Campbell and Will Tacey
339	19	"Blowing the Whistle"	Jeremy Webb	Andrew Holden	12 January 2002	8.18
Patrick returns to work; his first patient turns out to be a male-to-female transsexual, whose reconstructed organs have become infected and need removing. She prefers to die rather than be left stuck halfway and Philippa is prepared to let her but Patrick talks her into having the operation. An elderly farmer causes her son to sever his finger with a cleaver. Her poor eyesight causes her to bring a sausage instead of the finger and she is finally convinced to be examined, learning she has cataracts. Max attends a disciplinary hearing: There will be a note on his record for two years and he will have to retrain but he is permitted to return to work. A man takes his grandson to return a bike he stole from another boy but ends up being beaten up by the boy's father. He has palpitations in hospital and reveals he has angina. Philippa stops Anna taking his history and gives him the wrong treatment, causing a reaction with his treatment. He dies and Patrick and Lara report Philippa. Jan lets her resign immediately, warning her the family may make a complaint. The police are convinced someone helped Jason and Lewis, and Chloe admits to Anna it was her and she can't get hold of Jason. Tony finds the CCTV footage and tells Anna that Chloe has 24 hours to get away before he hands it over to the police. Guest starring Pat Keen, Peter Rylands and Holly Atkins Philippa Kinross departs.
340	20	"You're Going Home in the Back of an Ambulance"	Ian White	Paul Cornell	19 January 2002	8.77
Chloe takes Anna's place accompanying Comfort and Nikki in the ambulance to avoid the police. Tony hands the CCTV tape over and the order for her arrest is given. Chloe helps treat an obese man with a pulmonary embolism who has to be helped out of his flat by the fire brigade and a man with bipolar who got into a fight. She confesses to Nikki and Comfort; Comfort is unsympathetic but agrees to keep quiet when Chloe helps protect her from some racists injured during a dog fight. Tony has Fin pass on a package that arrived for Chloe: It contains a fake passport and a ticket to Miami with a note from Jason saying he'll meet her there. A newly-wed man tries to fix his wife's car but spills and ignites some petrol, dying of his burns in the ambulance. Chloe tries to slip away while attending a motorway pile-up but goes back when she sees a young girl trapped inside a car about to explode and gets her out in time. Nikki and Comfort cover for Chloe with the police while she slips out of the country. Guest starring Ken Christiansen, Malcolm Shields and Laila Rouass Departure of Staff Nurse, Chloe Hill
341	21	"Only the Lonely" (Note: See also "Only the Lonely" series 9)	Jim O'Hanlon	David Lane	26 January 2002	8.87
Max returns to work and soon gets everyone offside by being over officious. A woman smuggles her lover out of a window when her husband comes home unexpectedly but he falls from the roof. She tries to get Josh and Fin to take him away quietly but her husband sees him and kicks him, exacerbating a spinal injury. He attacks his wife at the hospital and Tony has to step in, with Max telling him the police will be called. His wife leaves him for her lover despite him now being reliant on a wheelchair. Agency nurse Melanie arrives as cover for Chloe but isn't qualified to work in Resus. A cricket coach says goodbye to his pupils; he is being let go from the club because of a back injury and is in financial difficulty. He gives his star pupil one of his prized signed bats, then tries to gas himself in his garage. He is saved by the boy and a neighbour, and at the hospital the boy shows him a petition by his class wanting him to stay on. Duffy has to leave to pick up Paul when her mother falls in and hails down a minicab; however, another woman takes it off her. The driver is a fake and tries to rape his passenger who stabs him with scissors and causes him to crash after he beats her. They both end up in hospital and Duffy worries about the boys if anything happened to her. Lara is studying for her registrar's exams and tells Patrick she is going away with a college friend; the friend turns out to be female and Lara and Patrick kiss. Jack arranges for Nikki to move into Chloe's old room with Anna but Nikki is concerned that Jack has a lump on his testicle and wants him to get checked out. Guest starring Paul Viragh, Aidan McArdle and Toby Sawyer Agency Nurse, Melanie Phillips appears as a guest.
342	22	"In the Heat of the Night"	Gwennan Sage	Edel Brosnan	2 February 2002	8.79
The groom at a wedding announces during his speech at the reception that the bride is cheating on him with the best man, sparking a brawl. At the hospital, he tells her he intends to have the marriage annulled and simply wanted a chance to humiliate her. Lara lets a woman with a fractured wrist go to a job interview rather than stay in for an operation. Fin and Comfort pick up a man who is due to have a kidney transplant but he suffers a heart attack, ruling him out. He refuses to let his girlfriend stay with him. Spencer shuts down the boiler after the handyman fails to adjust the thermostat which has been left too high, but this results in the department being too cold. Nikki is still trying to convince Jack to get himself checked out and he goes to Dillon for advice. He later lets a man with angina leave without a GTN spray only for him to collapse in the car park and go back in as an emergency. Jack goes to see Max who has him referred. Guest starring David Partridge, David Burke and Angel Coulby
343	23	"Acceptance"	Graham Wetherell	David Joss Buckley	9 February 2002	8.13
A solicitor who has injured his wrist playing squash is obsessed with being "balanced" and wants his other wrist put in plaster too. He gets his wish after being knocked over by some boys who have been mooning in the department and injuring the other wrist. The boy turns out to be the son of a hospital director. Patrick learns he has been given a consultant's post in London and gives three months' notice. Lara books them a table at an expensive hotel but instead meets him in the swimming pool, after which they book into a room together. Jack sees his consultant, Frey, who thinks the lump is probably cancerous and wants the testicle to be removed. Jack refuses and tells everyone he got the all clear, but admits the truth to his nan, who tells Tony. A DJ has a brain haemorrhage and Anna and Nikki volunteer Jack to take his place at a club. A fight breaks out when one of the patrons sexually assaults a woman and the nightclub owner is accidentally stabbed in the arm when he intervenes; Tony and Jack control the bleeding until the ambulance arrives. Tony tells Jack their mother died of cancer and Jack agrees to the treatment. Guest starring Davyd Harries, Kathleen Worth and Tyler Butterworth
344	24	"Nobody's Perfect" (Note: See also "Nobody's Perfect" series 9 & "Nobody's Perfect" series 20)	Reza Moradi	Jo O'Keefe	16 February 2002	8.86
The new temp receptionist turns up late and turns out to be Spencer's daughter Gilly. Josh, Comfort and Tony organise a charity fundraiser outside the hospital. An elderly woman with food poisoning is left waiting in a wheelchair in the corridor for hours. Dillon tells a man who claims to be her son that officially she is only supposed to wait for four hours only for him to turn out to be a journalist. Fin has to climb in a window to treat a mother with a severe asthma attack. Colette discovers she has been selling dexatrim, prescribed to her son for Attention Deficit Disorder and reluctantly reports her to Social Services, resulting in her children being taken into care. A factory worker with minor burns tries to chat up several staffmembers. A teenager brought in after taking ecstasy is aggressive and punches Lara, who Patrick has to restrain from retaliating. She later collapses in reception and turns out to be having a thyroid storm. Jack undergoes surgery and Nikki tries to support him but he breaks up with her, although afterwards he seems to regret it. Guest starring Caroline Trowbridge, Liam Hess and Davyd Harries Receptionist, Gilly is introduced.
345	25	"What Becomes of the Broken Hearted"	Lawrence Gordon Clark	Stephen McAteer	23 February 2002	9.27
Fin and Nikki come across a driver tailgating an ambulance who turns out to be Rob. They next find an elderly Polish man who is mistrustful of doctors, having been experimented on in a concentration camp. Nikki convinces him to come in but Patrick quickly learns he has emphysema exacerbated by pneumonia and there is nothing they can do, not even find him a bed on a ward. Nikki asks Josh and Spencer to help take him home but he dies in the ambulance. A spiritualist who had a crystal ball dropped on her foot during an altercation is brought in but Spencer has to ask her to leave when she spooks everyone with grim predictions of their future; she does however pick up on an attraction between Fin and Comfort. Josh and Comfort are called out by a frequent hoax caller, who complains of stomach pains in order to get a lift to his social club, which is near the hospital. Josh gets him to admit to making it up by threatening to give him an enema. The pair meet Gemma, one of a group of squatters who was injured by the building owner, but she refuses transport. Ambulance crews and medical teams led by Dillon are later called back after someone sets the place on fire, leaving Gemma's sister Sally and several others trapped. Fin meets Roy, a burned man who says he tried to get them out, and later realises, after he has left in an ambulance, that he was the owner and started the fire. He tries to warn Josh and Comfort which results in Roy dousing Comfort in paraffin and threatening her with a lighter, but he falls out of the ambulance after setting his sleeve on fire. Sally dies in theatre and the police go to speak to Roy. Fin and Comfort share a charged hug just before Rob comes in. Dillon finds Gemma outside the hospital and she asks him to help her. Guest starring David Graham, Bridget Turner and Steven Wickham
346	26	"Life Incognito"	A.J. Quinn	Tony McHale	2 March 2002	8.80
A group of teenagers steal bags from patients in reception; one of them tries to mug Lara outside but she punches him in the face. Jan reprimands Tony for not noticing them and Spencer covers for Gilly, who didn't raise the alarm. A patient tries to claim compensation for a stolen bag but Tony and Gilly find she has hidden it in the toilet. The boy that Lara hit is later brought in with a broken nose; Lara recognises him and he is arrested. Gemma is staying with Dillon but he is disconcerted when she tries to seduce him. She is later found by Josh and Nikki having apparently been run over and tells the staff what is going on. Charlie realises her injuries don't match and tells her to leave but fails to convince her or Dillon to end the arrangement. A young man, Lee, is attacked by a mob at a railway station. At the hospital, he asks to see his mother Louise but she cannot be contacted until she is brought in after a suicide bid. It turns out Lee killed a classmate who spread the fact Louise was a prostitute around school and Louise refused to tell the police why he did it. Lee is stabbed outside the department by his victim's father and Tony rushes him into Resus; Louise shows an interest in seeing him when he recovers. Anna convinces Tony to apply for a job as a health care assistant. Simone, a friend of Gilly's, turns up to buy drugs from her. Patrick learns Lara has passed her registrar's exam but is disappointed that she plans to take his job rather than come to London with him. Guest starring Rhys Miles Thomas, Di Botcher and John Francis
347	27	"You Can't Take Them All Home With You"	Graham Wetherell	Leslie Stewart	9 March 2002	8.43
Tony starts work as an emergency department assistant. His first job is assisting Lara with a woman with a cut leg who ends up hitting Lara. Tony treats her as violent and later learns she is a manic depressive. Josh is working in the department on a refresher course and helps Colette deal with a man claiming he has urine retention by trying to get a urine sample. Casualties are brought in from a car crash: The woman driver dies and her boyfriend is shocked to discover she was married with two sons, leading a double life. Anna tells Spencer she thinks Gilly is selling ecstasy. Patrick takes Lara to a jeweller's and proposes to her but she gives a noncommital answer. Charlie and Dillon have arranged Gemma a place at a hostel but she cuts herself soon after arrival and is taken to hospital. She disappears while Dillon is helping a heart attack victim and Charlie refuses to let Dillon leave work to look for her. Dillon comes home to find Gemma has taken an overdose and she dies in hospital. Dillon is unimpressed by Charlie's insistence that they did all they could for her. Guest starring Carole Nimmons, Stewart Harwood and Timothy Watson
348	28	"Past, Present, Future"	Tim Leandro	Paul Cornell	16 March 2002	8.83
Patrick is going to London to view properties and unsuccessfully proposes to Lara before he goes. A businessman, Cuthbertson, falls asleep driving on the motorway. In a daze, he wanders around the road picking up papers, causing a minibus to crash. Patrick arrives and goes to help the occupants but a petrol tanker crashes into them and knocks them into a ditch. This starts a pile-up which delays the emergency vehicles; Fin and Comfort get through on bikes and Fin drives the petrol tanker away when it catches fire. Lara and Anna join a medical team to help treat the injured. A lorry driver accidentally turns the freezer on in the back of his vehicle and eventually has to admit it is full of illegal immigrants; Nikki gets the lorry open and the driver is arrested. The teacher driving the minibus dies of his injuries but Patrick keeps a motley collection of teenagers safe and has the youngest and smallest girl climb out to find help. Cuthbertson takes her to the emergency workers and Patrick and the others are rescued, the operation ending with only one fatality. Patrick goes to dinner with Lara instead of going to hospital. He proposes again, she accepts and he decides to stay in Holby with her. However, when she returns from the bathroom, he has collapsed from an undiagnosed head injury and is rushed into hospital. Guest starring Mark Jax, Frankie Fitzgerald and Ben Evans Death of Registrar, Patrick Spiller.
349	29	"Memories"	Neil Adams	Peter Mills	23 March 2002	7.37
The staff gather for Patrick's funeral but Lara is unable to bring herself to attend and drives away. She insists on going into work even though Max has arranged locum registrar Simon Kaminski as a replacement for Patrick. A jogger is brought in after being hit by a car, suffering from amnesia. The name he gives is of a man who died of burns a few weeks earlier. When the car driver turns out to be the dead man's widow, it transpires the jogger is an Ofsted inspector who blames himself for the man's suicide after getting a bad report and was trying to get himself killed by the man's wife. A man who survived a heart bypass is brought in after having a stroke and his wife has to face the fact he will never recover. A couple of female hikers are found, one of them with a broken collarbone. Tony deduces they are actually base jumpers. Lara wants to discharge the injured one but Colette gets Simon to look at the x-ray and he realises she has a punctured lung: If she'd flown home as planned, she'd have died. Spencer looks after an old woman abandoned in reception until she dies. Anna sees Gilly passing drugs to Simone. Lara decides to take time off and at Patrick's wake introduces herself to his father Gordon, who Max had earlier given a tour of the department. Fin and Comfort kiss but Rob arrives before anything further can happen. Guest starring Tom Adams, Doreen Mantle and Stanley Page Registrar, Simon Kaminski is introduced.
350	30	"Hearts and Minds"	A.J. Quinn	Danny McCahon and David Lane	30 March 2002	4.66
A squash player, Claire, is brought in with a minor injury. Simon recognises her as an old girlfriend and is shocked to discover she is now engaged to his brother, Stuart. Josh and Nikki pick up Simone after she collapses in a nightclub. She claims she has only been drinking but Max realises she has taken ecstasy. Anna recognises her and calls the police; Gilly is arrested. Jack returns to work and tries to patch things up with Nikki. A priest brings in a young woman he found in the church with apparently stigmatic injuries. Simon is unable to come up with an explanation and refers her to a psychiatrist. Fin and Comfort are ambushed by youths who steal their ambulance. When they are approached by a girl whose rabbit was shocked with a defibrillator, they track the youths down to a nearby building. The thugs threaten to shock Comfort but Fin saves her. Back at the ambulance station, Fin and Comfort get passionate. Guest starring Justin Pierre, Sam Loggin, Richard Hawley and Dominique Jackson NOTE: This episode had to be shown on BBC Two, due to some schedule changes on BBC One resulting from the death of Queen Elizabeth The Queen Mother earlier that day.
351	31	"Dominoes"	Jeremy Webb	James Wood	6 April 2002	7.09
Comfort goes to church to confess her adultery with Fin but ends up leaving halfway through. A man dies of a heart attack in Resus but it takes six hours to realise his brother is already in the hospital and give him the news. Jack arranges a date with the girlfriend of a man who had a fall. Colette sees Simon with Claire and he admits the situation. An elderly woman is brought in from a care home but her uninterested escort hasn't brought her notes. Simon keeps her in for an x-ray and the care worker's negligence results in her falling off the trolley: She had hip replacements, making the x-ray unnecessary, but has now damaged her spine. Tony wonders if Dillon is gay. A wheelchair-using man is brought in after deliberately taking an overdose. When he is left completely disabled by a stroke, his wife carries out his wishes and smothers him; she is arrested. A man needs stitches in his hand but Charlie and Colette are repeatedly called away. He leaves in a huff but is brought back in after being in a car crash. Charlie tells Jan it happened because the department is overworked. Guest starring Paul Venables, Poppy Miller, Nicole Faraday, Mina Anwar and Sam Loggin
352	32	"Waving Not Drowning" (Note: See also "Not Waving But Drowning" series 9 & "Not Waving But Drowning" series 14)	Sven Arnstein	Edel Brosnan	13 April 2002	7.75
Jan heads a press conference in which she insists the hospital is not under threat from Norwalk's virus. However, Simon learns Meg is dying from it. The department is overcrowded; Lara diagnoses a patient with acute appendicitis but she is still in the department when it ruptures. New student nurse Roxanne Bird is left looking after an elderly man who dies in a corridor. Charlie and Colette pretend to his family that he is still just alive so they can say goodbye, but his wife, a retired nurse, later tells Roxanne that she knows he was dead and blames her. Roxanne has turned up with her bags after her mother threw her out so Anna offers her a sofa to stay on. A man who has broken up with his girlfriend falls off a ladder and breaks his leg and both his wrists. He decides to get back with her so she will look after him. Colette learns of Fin's liaison with Comfort and that Simon has slept with Claire, who is still planning to marry Stuart. Max closes the department, leaving ambulance staff treating patients in the car park, and Simon resorts to using a metal detector to find a coin a boy swallowed. Dillon feels ill and may have Norwalk's but Jan insists he is simply tired and sends him home, angering Charlie. Guest starring Ann Penfold, David Michaels and Shelley Conn Student Nurse, Roxanne Bird is introduced.
353	33	"Big Rocks and Very Hard Places"	Adrian Bean	David Joss Buckley	20 April 2002	8.06
Ambulances are still queued up outside the department and Jan gets Max to allow four patients in on trolleys, which she dubs "mobile beds". A man with abdominal pains leaves after it turns out to be constipation. A man with a broken arm is ejected after causing trouble and injuring another man, who admits he has nothing wrong with him but his wife died in the department recently. A man with an abscess on his leg reacts badly to medication Simon gave him without checking and later has it burst when another man tries to steal a trolley for his wife, who he decides to take to St. James'. A woman who was sent away after suffering a dog bite returns with the wound infected. Simon and Lara are both applying for Patrick's old job. Anna wants Roxanne to move in full time to help with the rent; Nikki suspects Roxanne is after Jack but agrees to her moving in after arranging a date with Jack. Fin tries to get Comfort to leave Rob for him. Dillon is reported to be fine but Charlie refuses to leaves the department to attend a meeting and resigns as clinical nurse specialist. A young man, Danny, is brought in from a care home for people with cerebral palsy: His mother is the local MP, Justine Walker. He ends up dying in a corridor after getting fluid on his lungs and Justine tells Jan she is going to demand an investigation. Guest starring Ben McKay, Polly Nayler and Brian Miller
354	34	"Scapegoat"	Andy Hay	David Joss Buckley	27 April 2002	6.96
Danny's death has made front page news and Justine interrupts Jan's press conference to dismiss an internal investigation as a whitewash. Max refuses to alter reports on the incident, hoping the publicity will lead to change. Simon refuses Lara permission to do a lumbar puncture on a haemorrhaging patient, since it will be unreliable. Later, an elderly person with diabetes is brought in by his middle-aged daughter, who still lives at home but is planning to move in with a friend. Lara suspects he let his condition deteriorate so his daughter would stay; Simon refuses to let her discharge him but she is later proved right. The daughter admits the friend is actually his girlfriend. Colette accidentally hits a reporter with a door and Duffy supervises Roxanne suturing her head. A frequent patient who turned to drink after his wife died defends the staff to the reporter. A widowed GP has left his teenage daughter looking after his young son. When he is delayed taking the boy to the dentist, the girl attempts to drive him herself, despite not having passed her test, and crashes. She dies in Resus. At a party to celebrate Roxanne moving in, Dillon gets Anna to dye his hair brown so people will stop thinking he's gay. Jack tries to sleep with Nikki but is unable to perform and suggests they just be friends. Comfort confesses her affair to Rob and he orders her out. Guest starring David Bamber, Leona Walker and Jack Townsend
355	35	"Too Close for Comfort"	Gwennan Sage	Colin Wyatt	4 May 2002	8.15
The staff are taking bets on when Jan will leave and she ends up assaulting a reporter, James. When Charlie refuses to write a report helping her, she summons James to her office and deliberately lets him see Max's file. Rob visits Comfort and tries to get her to come home: She is staying with Josh and Colette. Nikki and Comfort are called out to a house where a man has collapsed with angina. Even though he dies at the scene, Comfort pretends he is alive so his wife can have the last rites administered, only for their GP to reveal the truth, angering the wife. Their next call is a boy who drank pesticide but his father, not wanting his former wife to know since he has only just been given access, waits until they are en route to the hospital to reveal this and Lara has to talk Comfort through administering the antidote. They then pick up a woman who fainted at work; she is about to get married but doesn't seem to love her fiance and is simply doing what is expected. Nikki and Jack re-consummate their relationship in Max's office. Fin doesn't notice construction work while running in the woods and falls into a hole. A passerby tries to help him but falls in with him and talks about losing his wife. They end up working together to attract the attention of the workmen. Fin has missed a lunch date with Comfort and both he and Rob turn up as Comfort is leaving work; Comfort ends up going with Fin. Guest starring Griff Rhys Jones, Gabrielle Lloyd and Crispin Letts
356	36	"The Sting"	Graham Wetherell	Leslie Stewart	18 May 2002	9.35
The papers are full of stories of Max's involvement with Ben and Danny. Jan pretends to be supportive but makes no real attempt to help him. Two teenagers have met up in a stables behind their families' backs but the boy is stung by a bee and has an allergic reaction. The girl gets round a horse that was shut in with them to retrieve her phone and call for help, and his family thank her. A young woman, Paula, flees the scene of a shooting but is run over by a motorbike. She ends up in hospital with a young man who was injured in the incident and hides some drugs. The man who was pursuing her earlier turns up at the hospital and attacks her; Max saves her life but Tony later finds the drugs. Jack has set up a hairdressing business and Anna and Roxy use his equipment to treat two traveller children with lice who had swallowed GTN spray. Nikki finds some money missing from her purse and she and Anna suspect Roxy's boyfriend Hakken. Stuart visits Simon to discuss Claire having doubts. Nikki and Comfort meet Emma, a girl who has had a fall, and learn she is Fin's daughter; Comfort is angry that he kept it from her. The board tell Max to take two months' leave until the publicity has died down but he refuses and resigns instead. Guest starring Justin Pierre, Lucy Robinson and Jim Pyke Departure of Consultant, Max Gallagher.
357	37	"Denial"	Gill Wilkinson	Ann Marie Di Mambro	8 June 2002	8.47
Anna and Nikki want Hakken out of the flat. While everyone else is out, Hakken attempts to strip the flat of its furnishings but the fridge falls on him. Comfort and Nikki bring him into hospital, where Anna and Roxy are amused when he discharges himself, not realising his morphine will soon wear off. A music teacher is targeted by hate mongers, having been accused of child abuse, despite the charges being dropped. Two women harass him while he is out; one of them is hit by a car, while he suffers an angina attack. Charlie, one of his old pupils, recognises him and he explains he tried to help a troubled youngster. The two women harass him again, causing him to suffer another heart attack; Charlie angrily berates them. Duffy finds a woman, Melanie, wandering in a confused state: She has been beaten and raped. Lara calls the police but she refuses to make a statement, although it turns out her husband, David, is a police inspector. New consultant Harry Harper brings in two of his children, Jordan and Daisy, after his wife sacks the childminder and Duffy arranges for her mother to look after them. Melanie loses the baby she was carrying and Lara realises it was David who attacked her. David accuses her of breaching patient confidentiality and has Melanie transferred to a private hospital. Guest starring Raza Jaffrey, Roger Brierley and Fleur Bennett Consultant, Harry Harper is introduced.
358	38	"Taking It All Back to the Streets"	A.J. Quinn	Andrew Holden	15 June 2002	8.58
Two groups shoot at each other in a busy street; a mother with her husband and baby son are injured in the crossfire, as is an old man's dog. One of the participants, Scott, is left behind injured and all the casualties are taken to hospital. The mother is sent to surgery while Duffy helps her husband look after the baby. Tony arranges to have the dog taken away by the RSPCA and he is later returned recovered. The vehicle containing the other participants in the shooting runs over a teenage girl in a car park. At the hospital, she explains she was meeting her birth mother without her adoptive parents' knowledge. Anna and Tony go and fetch the woman and bring her to hospital; Anna explains she has never met her father who has another family. The birth parents let her in to visit the girl. Both Claire and Stuart visit Simon who encourages Claire to go through with the wedding and invites Roxy as his date. Simon learns he has the permanent registrar post. David arrives to investigate the shooting and tells Lara that Scott and his brother Virgil run a protection racket. Virgil is dumped outside after being shot and David realises they shot each other. Both brothers die and Lara stops David claiming Scott is alive to get information from their mother; Scott was taking money behind Virgil's back. David attacks Lara in the car park and she reaches for a brick. Guest starring Sam Loggin, Justin Pierre and John Bennett
359	39	"Broken Hearts"	Adrian Bean	Stuart Morris	22 June 2002	8.88
Lara has hit David with the brick and calls for an ambulance. Colette accompanies her to the police station where she tells the police she thought David was going to rape or kill her, explaining he was the one that attacked Melanie. Roxy's mother Stella brings in Roxy's daughter Nicole, who she has been looking after for her, telling her she needs to look after her now. Roxy tries to get Duffy to babysit and then leaves her in a cupboard, but after a talking to from Dillon she tells a stunned Anna and Nikki that Nicole is moving in with them. Stuart and Claire both turn up to tell Simon the wedding is off but Claire refuses to get back with him. Simon learns he has the registrar's post. An elderly cyclist collapses in reception; he has a dissected aorta and will die without an operation but, because of his age, Simon is unable to get anyone to agree to operate. Jack and Tony pass round some of their gran's infamous cakes and is only after a few have been consumed that she rings to say she accidentally put ant crystals on them. Josh and Nikki look after an IT consultant who has had a heart attack. He offers Nikki a job as his PA but, after she has resigned, she finds out he has died. Josh reveals he didn't pass the resignation on. Lara returns to the hospital to find David being rushed into theatre in a bad way. Guest starring Justin Pierre, Sam Loggin and Sue Perkins
360	40	"Code Red"	Jeremy Webb	Paul Cornell	29 June 2002	9.31
Harry is confirmed as permanent consultant and tells Charlie of Jan's role in Max's resignation. Charlie ends the relationship. Lara visits David as he regains consciousness; Melanie is polite to Lara but still standing by her husband. David vows to make Lara pay but then deteriorates and dies. Nikki volunteers herself and Fin to take a call at a block of flats. They find the resident, Wayne, has been stabbed by Graham, whose wife he was having an affair with. Graham stabs Nikki in the stomach and slashes Fin's hands. Fin calls for help; Josh and Comfort arrive with the police and Comfort talks Graham down, after which he throws himself off the balcony. All the casualties are taken to hospital: Graham is saved but Wayne dies in Resus. Fin needs to see a hand specialist. Jack proposes to an unconscious Nikki before she arrests. The police arrest Lara for David's murder as the rest of the team fight to save Nikki's life. Guest starring Ewan Bailey, Russell Mabey and Dawn Hope Porter Spencer and Chief Executive Officer Jan Goddard depart.
