= Gittens =

Gittens is a surname of Welsh and English origin with several meanings. Notable people with the surname include:

- Céline Gittens, Trinidadian ballerina
- Charles Gittens (1928–2011), American Secretive Service agent
- Chris Gittens (born 1994), American baseball player
- George A. Gittens (1909–1974), American film editor
- Hugo Gittens (born 1936), Trinidadian weightlifter
- Jamie Gittens (born 2004), English footballer
- Jon Gittens (1964–2019), English footballer
- Kenneth Gittens (born 1971), Virgin Islands politician
- Kurleigh Gittens Jr. (born 1997), Canadian football player
- Lancelot Gittens (born 1974), Guyanese middle-distance runner and hurdler
- Ramon Gittens (born 1987), Barbadian sprinter
- Roshon Gittens (born 2002), Barbadian footballer
- Stanton Gittens (1911–1994), Barbadian cricketer
- Tyra Gittens (born 1998), Trinidadian Olympic athlete
- Wyndham Gittens (1885–1967), Barbadian screenwriter

== See also ==
- Gettins, surname
- Gittins, surname
