= Jack Gittins =

English footballer

Personal information
- Full name: John Henry Gittins
- Date of birth: 11 November 1893
- Place of birth: Stanton Hill, England
- Date of death: 1956 (aged 62–63)
- Position: Full-back

Senior career*
Years	Team	Apps	(Gls)
1912–1914	Bentley Colliery		
1914–1926	Barnsley	260	(7)
1926–1927	Chesterfield	10	(0)
1927	Wombwell		
Total		270	(7)
- * Club domestic league appearances and goals

John Henry Gittins (11 November 1893 – 1956) was an English footballer who played in the Football League for Barnsley and Chesterfield.
