= Rob Gittins =

British television writer

- Occupation: Writer

Rob Gittins is a British screenwriter and novelist. TV shows he has written for include EastEnders, Tiger Bay, The Bill, Casualty, and Emmerdale. Gittins is the longest-serving writer on EastEnders and in 2015 he received an Outstanding Achievement Award (off-screen) at the British Soap Awards. He has also written over twenty radio plays for BBC Radio 4, and a drama series, Losing Paradise, which won the Gold Drama Medal at the New York International Radio Festival. He has published five novels.
