= David Joss Buckley =

British screenwriter, playwright, author, actor, and musician

David Joss Buckley (born 17 June 1948) is a British screenwriter, playwright, author, actor, and musician. A BAFTA-nominated screenwriter, Buckley has written many hours of television drama, including episodes of Emmerdale (1989–1996), EastEnders, Rosemary & Thyme, Down To Earth, Lucy Sullivan Is Getting Married and Casualty. He was an associate producer and lead writer for A Mind to Kill. He co-wrote series 1 of BBC 4's Hinterland His most recent TV work is an 8-part series entitled "Cold Courage" adapted from books by Finnish author Pekka Hiltunen. The series screened in Nordic territories in Spring, 2020. He has also written for radio, for pantomimes, and has authored published books.

== Biography ==
=== Early work ===
Prior to his writing career Buckley was an actor, performing in London's West End and at the Royal National Theatre, the Young Vic Theatre and the Old Vic Theatre. He also appeared in The Professionals and Rock Follies.

=== Writing ===
He has adapted several books for the stage, including James M Cain's Double Indemnity, produced several times in the UK; Stephen King's Dolores Claiborne, produced in Germany and France and nominated for Globe De Crystal by Paris Premiere, 2007; and Girl with a Pearl Earring (from the novel of the same name), performed at the Arts Theatre, Cambridge and Theatre Royal, London in autumn 2008.
