= Casualty series 13 =

Thirteenth series of Casualty

Casualty
- Series 13
- Starring: Donna Alexander; Jan Anderson; Pal Aron; Ian Bleasdale; Claire Goose; Robert Gwilym; Paterson Joseph; Jonathan Kerrigan; Gerald Kyd; Rebecca Lacey; Barbara Marten; Vincenzo Pellegrino; Cathy Shipton; Derek Thompson; Rebecca Wheatley
- No. of episodes: 28

Release
- Original network: BBC One
- Original release: 5 September 1998 – 13 March 1999

Series chronology
- ← Previous; Series 12 Next → Series 14

The thirteenth series of the British medical drama television series Casualty commenced airing in the United Kingdom on BBC One on 5 September 1998 and finished on 13 March 1999.

== Production ==
Johnathan Young took over from Sally Haynes as producer for this series. Typically producers join Casualty from other TV series but Young was unique in the fact he had directed previous episodes and was the production manager for series 5.

Series 13 was the first series to be broadcast in 16:9 widescreen and saw an increase in episodes, this time to 28, including a feature-length Christmas episode. The opening two-part episode, "Internal Inferno", aired on consecutive nights showing a dramatic school fire. The series also acted as a launchpad for characters and storylines in the spin-off series Holby City, which started on 12 January 1999.

The events introduced in episode 19 continue across the first four episodes of Holby City series 1. The character Nicola, portrayed by Joanna Kirkland, is transferred from Holby A&E to Darwin Ward to undergo a cardiothoracic surgery after being crushed in a crowd. Several cast members from Casualty series 13 appear in episodes of Holby City series 1, establishing a connection between the two series. Charlie appears in episode 1, Chloe in episodes 1 & 2, Sam in episode 2, Tina in episode 3 and Sunny in episodes 1, 2, 8 & 9. Notably, the Holby City characters Nick Jordan and Julie Fitzjohn make guest appearances in episodes 13 and 17 of this series prior to Holby City airing.

"Love Over Gold" is the second two-part episode concluding the series where George and Josh are taken hostage after a bank raid. In the finale, Sam, played by Jonathan Kerrigan, falls backwards from a hospital balcony during a confrontation with a patient's husband. In an interview, Kerrigan reveals he performed the dramatic stunt himself. Sam's fate remains unknown until the first episode of series 14, which continues the story immediately after the fall.

== Cast ==
=== Overview ===
The thirteenth series of Casualty features a cast of characters working in the emergency department of Holby City Hospital. The series began with 10 roles with star billing, which was an increase from the previous series. Rebecca Lacey starred as senior house officer Georgina "George" Woodman. Derek Thompson continued his role as charge nurse Charlie Fairhead and Barbara Marten portrayed sister Eve Montgomery. Paterson Joseph appeared as senior staff nurse Mark Grace while Jonathan Kerrigan and Claire Goose starred as staff nurses Sam Colloby and Tina Seabrook. Ian Bleasdale and Donna Alexander continued their roles as paramedics Josh Griffiths and Penny Hutchens. Rebecca Wheatley portrayed receptionist Amy Howard.

Episode one featured four new cast members: Robert Gwilym (clinical director and emergency medicine consultant Max Gallagher); Gerald Kyd (senior house officer Sean Maddox); Jan Anderson (staff nurse Chloe Hill); and Pal Aron (bed manager Adam Osman). Susan Cookson also made her first appearance as recurring character, nurse Julie Day in episode one. Following a guest stint at the end of the previous series, Cathy Shipton reprised her role as original character Lisa "Duffy" Duffin in episode four. Duffy returned as an agency nurse, but was later invited to join the team as a senior staff nurse. Joseph decided to leave the series in 1998; Mark Grace departed in episode 18. Lacey also chose to leave the series and her character, George Woodman, left at the conclusion of the series.

This series set up several storylines and characters for the show's spin-off series, Holby City. Michael French and Nicola Stephenson guest appeared in episodes thirteen and seventeen as their Holby City characters, Nick Jordan and Julie Fitzjohn. Hospital director, Gary Milton (Ian Keith), also appeared in both this series and Holby City, setting up a storyline which saw the hospital threatened with closure.

=== Main characters ===
- Donna Alexander as Penny Hutchens
- Jan Anderson as Chloe Hill (from episode 1)
- Pal Aron as Adam Osman (from episode 1)
- Ian Bleasdale as Josh Griffiths
- Claire Goose as Tina Seabrook
- Robert Gwilym as Max Gallagher (from episode 1)
- Paterson Joseph as Mark Grace (until episode 18)
- Jonathan Kerrigan as Sam Colloby
- Gerald Kyd as Sean Maddox (from episode 1)
- Rebecca Lacey as Georgina "George" Woodman (until episode 28)
- Barbara Marten as Eve Montgomery
- Vincenzo Pellegrino as Derek "Sunny" Sunderland
- Cathy Shipton as Lisa "Duffy" Duffin (from episode 4)
- Derek Thompson as Charlie Fairhead
- Rebecca Wheatley as Amy Howard

=== Recurring characters ===
- Susan Cookson as Julie Day (episodes 1−2, from episode 20)
- Ian Keith as Gary Milton (from episode 20)
- Ian Kershaw as Pat Garrett (episodes 3−27)
- Tobias Menzies as Frank Gallagher (episodes 7−19)
- Bryan Murray as James Roberts (episodes 13−20)
- Patrick Romer as Marius Petrescu (episodes 19−26)

=== Guest characters ===
- Michael French as Nick Jordan (episodes 13 and 17)
- Caroline Holdaway as Eileen Rafferty (episodes 8, 12 and 26)
- Kaleem Janjua as Kamal Osman (episodes 20 and 21)
- Graham McTavish as Gerry Talbot (episodes 10 and 18)
- Alan Rothwell as Anthony Rafferty (episodes 12 and 26)
- Rosie Rowell as Pam Wilson (episodes 5−16)
- Christopher Simon as Lee Anderson (episodes 13−16)
- Nicola Stephenson as Julie Fitzjohn (episodes 13 and 17)

== Episodes ==
No. overall	No. in series	Title	Directed by	Written by	Original release date	UK viewers (millions)
227	1	"Internal Inferno – Part One"	Nigel Douglas	Tony McHale	5 September 1998	11.23
Charlie deals with an aggressive patient, Hannah, who wants an abortion. She later leaves, abandoning her daughter Cassie. A young man, Nick, pretends to be ill so his friends can steal from the hospital, but after they have left he really does feel ill. New nurse Chloe Hill looks after Bonnie (Lorraine Chase), who has a cut face, and finds her hiding in the toilet after her husband Richard shows up. Sam and new consultant Max Gallagher try to treat a baby brought in by Jasvir, an Indian woman who cannot speak English. They ask British Asian bed manager Adam Osman for help but he only speaks English. They eventually realise the baby has carbon monoxide poisoning. Amy tells Sam and Sunny she and Keith have broken up. George and Mark have also broken up. Headteacher Hiberton tries to question Andy Horne, the father of troublesome pupil Murray, but backs down. Teacher Liz refuses to teach Murray, who threatens classmates Joe and Keeley with a knife. Joe hides in caretaker Sterling's cupboard, where a discarded cigarette sets a sofa alight. Supply teacher Andrea finds Sterling has locked the fire door and tries to shelter her class including Murray and Andrea; Joe also tries to get a lost girl to safety. Josh and Penny find Liz buried under rubble. Tina calls Cassie's father Gary to pick her up, but as he enters the car park Nick's friends, who are carrying him, step out in front of his lorry and he crashes into the police car containing Mark and nurse Julie Day. Guest starring Jacqueline Kington, Ralph Arliss, Lorraine Chase, Bhasker Patel and Shaun Dooley Note: Music Theme Tune shortened
228	2	"Internal Inferno – Part Two"	Nigel Douglas	Tony McHale	6 September 1998	10.37
Charlies despatches George to the fire instead. Julie is quickly freed from the car but Mark has a head injury and needs extensive treatment. Chloe fails to get Sean's attention about Bonnie so instead arranges to have her sent straight to the surgical team. Richard explains Bonnie was beaten up by loan sharks. Tina learns Nick injected himself with alcohol and he dies in Resus. His friend Laila makes a statement to the police. Joe gets the girl he is with up to the roof where she is rescued by fire crews, then rescues Anthea and her class with a fire extinguisher and gets them out the same way. However, he collapses from smoke inhalation before he can get out himself. He is rescued by Josh and a fire crew and taken to intensive care. His mother Louise turns up with Andy; she walked out on her family for him and estranged husband Dave refuses to let her see Joe. Hibberton quizzes Stirling about the presence of gas canisters. Hannah is brought in with bleeding after performing a DIY operation, while Cassie is reunited with Gary. Tina tells Sam she is going to get her own flat. Guest starring Paul B. Henry, Jacqueline Kington, Terence Harvey, Bhasker Patel, Ralph Arliss, Lorraine Chase and John Bleasdale
229	3	"Honey Bunny"	Paul Wroblewski	Jeff Povey	12 September 1998	9.82
A man is brought in after falling off a ladder trying to break into his own flat. He needs a splenectomy but when his wife comes in she announces they are Jehovah's Witnesses. Max decides to do the operation without a transfusion. George speaks to his wife and learns that they aren't Jehovah's Witnesses but he has tried to commit suicide three times before. The operation goes ahead with the transfusion and it turns out his fall was an accident. A couple try to rob a shop dressed as a cat and rabbit but the shopkeeper attacks them with a baseball bat. They run over a man who was in the shop earlier and crash before fleeing. The man is taken to the Holby where he meets a young woman he had been writing to. He served in the Falklands with her brother and ran off leaving him to die, then lied and was given a medal. The woman leaves, disgusted. Amy sees a young pickpocket in reception and calls the police. She is arrested after tripping over a dog, but not before biting policeman Pat Garrett, who Chloe flirts with. The female robber takes her boyfriend, who has a head injury, to hospital but ends up hiding in the toilet from the police. Sunny finds them and she takes him hostage but when Max and Tina block their way Sunny manages to overpower her. She is arrested and her boyfriend is treated. Tina and Chloe arrange to get a flat together. Eve tells Charlie they are short-staffed with Mark out of action so he decides to call Duffy. George visits Mark who regains consciousness while she is there. Guest starring Alison Dowling, Jacqueline Pirie, Andrew Knott and Hannah Waterman
230	4	"The Ties That Bind" (Note: See also "The Ties That Bind" series 7, "The Ties That Bind" series 17, "The Ties That Bind" series 26 & "The Ties That Bind Us" series 19)	Michael Owen Morris	Andrew Rattenbury	19 September 1998	11.46
Duffy rejoins the department as an agency nurse and helps Charlie deal with a patient who is afraid of injections. George and Sunny worry she is there to replace Mark. Charlie orders Adam to find Mark a private room. A driver gets into an argument with a biker and rams him, causing him to crash, before running over a pedestrian. Tina recognises the biker, a friend of hers, and knows his father is a police sergeant. He dies of his wounds and his father punches the driver, who is arrested when he is found to be over the limit. The pedestrian sends Josh and Penny to his flat where his wife is handcuffed to a radiator: She is a heroin addict who has had several miscarriages because of the drugs. She has just miscarried one of a pair of twins and they locked her up to try and get her to go cold turkey. Tina and Chloe throw a housewarming party where Tina dances with Sean while Chloe sleeps with Pat. Guest starring Chris Gascoyne, John Bowler and Davyd Harries
231	5	"Toys and Boys"	Julian Holmes	Tony Basgallop	26 September 1998	12.58
A woman takes her son to a toyshop where he starts playing with a girl. The girl accidentally sets off an alarm and runs out into the road. The boy's mother tries to save her but they are both hit by a car. The girl, who turns out to be from a children's home, only has minor injuries but the woman dies. The boy's father is initially harsh towards him; George helps him see that he needs to show him the love he isn't getting from his mother instead of just disciplining him. Eve is recognised by a girl who was attacked while begging; she is a volunteer at a homeless shelter. A man is chased through a shopping mall by men he owes money to and pushed off a balcony; the thugs then go to his house and take goods in compensation, terrorising his oblivious wife. The man turns out to be a vicar who lost his faith after being diagnosed with cancer and started gambling. A young man tries to spray paint a message for his girlfriend on a motorway bridge but accidentally sprays himself in the face. Charlie patches him up and he goes back to finish the message. A biker with an injured bottom makes a pass at Tina who freaks out; Chloe punishes him with iodine. Sean manages to upset a hypochondriac woman and Charlie takes him to task. Duffy gives Charlie advice on visiting Baz. Guest starring Malcolm Sinclair, Lorraine Hilton and Eve Steele
232	6	"Eye Spy"	Gary Love	Andrew Rattenbury	3 October 1998	12.16
Mark has started back at the department as a nurse practitioner, while Eve offers Duffy a permanent position as senior staff nurse. A man and a boy are brought in after falling from a church roof while stealing lead. The man dies and Tina is given the job of tracking down next of kin. She tracks down a woman via their car who identifies the man as her husband and the boy as their nephew. Mark rushes into bringing up organ donation and she agrees. Two teenage girls, Kelly and Rachel, go to a club where Kelly introduces Rachel to her older boyfriend Tony. Tony's girlfriend Pam turns up and starts a fight with Kelly in which Rachel and Richard, a man dressed as a woman, are injured. Richard's mother Barbara is brought into hospital; she believes Richard has a girlfriend he doesn't want her to meet and has deliberately injured herself with a bread knife. Duffy convinces Richard to talk to her. Rachel's over-protective father tries to drag her out of the hospital but she collapses from a chest injury and needs a chest drain. Mark is taken with Pam but Josh tells him Tony was her pimp. Tony leaves with Kelly. Josh has had a bet with Penny that he can find out something about her private life and gets his chance when a woman brought in with dye in her eyes and cataracts after an accident at a salon turns out to have fostered Penny once. Guest starring Michael O'Hagan, Neil Stuke, Rob Spendlove and Elizabeth Spriggs
233	7	"A Place of Safety"	Gill Wilkinson	Susan Boyd	10 October 1998	11.42
A&E is plagued by a number of minor cases, including two brothers who have playfully stabbed each other, a girl who may have leukaemia, a woman who picked up a tropical disease in India and a man who calls himself the Son of God and says he has cancer of the soul. Mother and daughter Gina and Danielle are behind on their rent. Danielle goes to her brother Luke, a drug dealer, for help, while Gina goes to her ex-boyfriend Mick, who she has had charged with rape and who merely gives her another beating. She takes an overdose and Danielle rushes her to hospital; Luke agrees to help out. One of Luke's customers, Frank, is arrested for possession and Max is called to bail him out; Frank is his son. A youth, Eugene, falls over in a pub, cutting his hand and hitting his head. Eve wants him put under observation but Sean discharges him after his friends hassle Tina. Eugene later collapses in a bookmaker's where Josh is putting a bet on for Sunny. He dies in Resus, leaving Sean in difficulties. Guest starring Ruth Mitchell, Paul Basson, Amy Scarth and Paul Panting
234	8	"She Loved the Rain"	Tim Leandro	Simon Mirren	17 October 1998	12.56
Chloe helps a difficult patient who has an epileptic fit, while Amy confronts a man taking notes in reception only to learn he is researching a television drama. An elderly woman dies in Resus after collapsing. Her husband has trouble coping and, when the staff are distracted, takes her body outside. Chloe and Adam bring them back. A woman in labour arrives outside the department with her husband and Sunny has to help George and Duffy deliver the baby in the car. Sean later saves the mother when she develops a bleed. Eugene Rafferty's mother comes to visit Sean and thanks him for trying to save him; Sean is depressed that she will hate him when she learns the full story. Four youths try to rob a warehouse but the security guard claims not to have the key. Two of the group climb on the roof but it gives way as Pat and his partner Felix arrive. One of the pair is left dangling from the roof with his leg impaled and Josh climbs up to get him down. He removes the metal from his leg at the hospital in an escape attempt but Max calmly tells him he's bleeding to death and he lets them treat him. Sam wonders about Adam's medical knowledge and learns he was a senior staff nurse in Melbourne. Frank throws himself down some stairs in the hope he'll be given drugs at the hospital; Max avoids him while he's there and gets George to handle the case. Guest starring Martin Freeman, Norman Wisdom and Nicholas Bailey
235	9	"Public Service"	Steve Shill	Gillian Richmond	24 October 1998	12.74
Charlie's return from holiday is delayed when a man flags him down in the street asking for help for his wife, who has been attacked by intruders. At the hospital, George and Tina quickly realise she has been raped and suspect the husband; she also has kidney damage and will need a transplant or dialysis. The husband pushes Adam during an argument and Sam patches him up; Adam reveals he is HIV positive. George calls the police against the wishes of both parties, calling it domestic assault. The husband tells Charlie that he gave evidence in a manslaughter trial and the defendant's brothers beat and raped his wife in front of him as revenge: Now he will either be blamed for the rape or put his family at risk by telling the truth. Chloe learns of Tina's rape. Two schoolgirls on their way back from a trip get into an argument on the minibus, distracting their teacher who crashes. The girls are all fine but the teacher has two broken legs. Sean examines an elderly woman who had a fall and realises she has glaucoma; Sunny tries to convince her to have treatment. Amy collapses in reception and is told she has gestational diabetes. Guest starring Michael Nardone, Valerie Gogan and Ryan Hurst
236	10	"It's Good to Talk"	Roberto Bangura	Deborah Cook	31 October 1998	11.92
Chloe accompanies Josh and Penny on the ambulances; Josh tries to get an advance on his wages. An Eastern European waitress at a hotel is having an affair with the manager. Her brother is found unconscious in the cold store, having been locked in while stealing meat. The waitress eventually learns her boyfriend pocketed the money their father gave him for accommodation and return tickets and her brother was trying to make enough money to get them home; she warns her boyfriend their father will punish him. Mark patches up Pam when she comes in with a cut face; she later returns with some flowers. Eve meets with Gerry, a vicar, who wants her to go to Romania with him; Charlie refuses to give her time off so Adam advises her to go over his head. Charlie and George make peace. A schoolboy complains of feeling ill; his mother wants to keep his off school but his grandfather, a retired GP, insists he's fine. The boy faints and falls off a bridge on a cross country run. Sean orders a scan, which shows he has a brain tumour. A deaf factory worker burns both his hands; Sam and Sean are both able to communicate with him via sign language. Guest starring Siobhan Fogarty, Melissa Collier and David Ryall
237	11	"Next of Kin"	Michael Owen Morris	Patrick Wilde	7 November 1998	11.04
A combination of locals and eco-warriors are protesting about the cutting down of a forest to make room for a motorway. Julia, the wife of local leader Donald, injures her arm during an attempt to clear the protestors but Donald refuses to go with her to hospital. Kenny and his girlfriend Asha are up in a tree but fall while trying to climb down. Kenny suffers a head injury and is declared brain dead in ITU. His brother, an army officer, refuses permission for organ donation. Confusion over who has been evacuated results in a tunnel collapsing on Donald and his counterpart Mickey, but both are rescued with no serious injuries. Donald and Julia separate. Charlie argues with Eve about her leave. Josh asks Duffy for money, which he conceals from Penny. Sam accidentally upsets Amy, and Adam admits he contracted HIV from a relationship with a man. Frank is brought in by the police after overdosing and Max admits to George that he is his son. Frank discharges himself and reveals his and Max's relationship in reception. Guest starring Jimmy Yuill, Jeremy Clyde and Parminder K. Nagra
238	12	"Home Truths"	Paul Wroblewski	Graham Mitchell	14 November 1998	11.70
A girl falls down some steps while with her childminder, who she seems closer to than her mother. The hospital's scanner is down so George decides to transfer her to Broadway. George and Chloe go with Josh and Penny in the ambulance and have to perform emergency treatment en route. The scan shows that she has a brain haemorrhage and needs surgery. Mark feels awkward after spending the night with Pam. Sunny charms a single mother with a sprained ankle and gets her number but loses it. A father brings in his son, who normally lives with his mother and has a severe nosebleed. While it is quickly stopped, he is found to have bruises on his body. Eve realises his blood isn't clotting because he has taken his father's warfarin tablets. The staff throw a party for Eve before she goes on her leave. Sean gives evidence at the inquest into Eugene's death and the coroner returns a verdict of death by misadventure. Afterwards, Eugene's father comes to the hospital and tells Sean they are suing him for negligence. Guest starring Michelle Holmes, Ella Jones and Ian Kelsey
239	13	"One from the Heart"	Alan Wareing	Barbara Machin	21 November 1998	12.71
A man dies after a heart attack. His common-law stepdaughter clashes with his semi-estranged biological daughter and later runs off with a ring she took from his finger; it turns out to be a paste one that she gave him. A teenager with manic depression causes chaos in the department and tells Charlie and agency nurse Lee Anderson that her father wants to get rid of her; despite this, Charlie convinces her parents to have her sectioned. Surgical consultant James Roberts forces his registrar Nick Jordan to do a demonstration for medical students in the department; Nick apologises to Charlie and Max and tells them he's after a transfer. A night-watchman has collapsed with heart troubles and Charlie and Max convince Roberts to operate on him; Charlie and Sam clash with nurse Julie Fitzjohn for letting a bed go spare on the surgical ward. Chloe gets a phone call saying that her mother has died and Charlie gives her the rest of the shift off. A pregnant woman is brought in in labour and her husband arrives back from the army. She believes he is having an affair but he convinces her otherwise; however, he later confesses to Charlie and Duffy that he did. Duffy confides in Charlie that she's having troubles at home: Peter is being bullied at school and Andrew is still seeing his girlfriend. Charlie heads off for a weekend with Baz but accidentally leaves the flowers he bought her with Duffy. Guest starring Jennifer Hennessy, James Garbutt and Louisa Milwood-Haigh
240	14	"Trust"	Claire Winyard	Chris Murray	28 November 1998	12.66
A woman who was bitten by a dog overhears Sean talking about his negligence suit and asks for someone else to treat her; however, he gains her trust by directing Tina to do it. A man insists on bringing in his terminally ill wife but Sean helps him realise that she doesn't want to die in hospital. He tries to get her taken home but when she arrests in her cubicle he tells the staff not to resuscitate her. Sunny accompanies Amy to a birthing class and tries to chat up one of the other birthing partners. Penny is called to a flat where a young mother is worried about her daughter. She turns out to have a chest infection and Penny has to carry out an emergency procedure in the ambulance. A diabetic prisoner is brought in after overdosing on insulin. Duffy, the senior nurse on shift, wants to get rid of him as soon as possible but Max insists on a thorough investigation when it turns out he is being beaten up by drug addicts for his needles. He tries to throw himself out a window so he'll be able to stay in hospital but Duffy convinces him to let the prison staff try and help him. Guest starring Lynda Bellingham, Michael Angelis, Rebecca Callard, Edward Peel and Paul Antony-Barber
241	15	"No Place Like Home"	Gill Wilkinson	Susan Boyd	5 December 1998	12.65
A boy runs away from a children's home after being teased for wetting the bed. He meets up with a friend who left the home weeks earlier, but the friend has been selling drugs for dealers and pocketing the money and is beaten up, ending up in hospital. The warden from the home comes to collect the other boy and points out that the home is better than being on the streets. Pam convinces Mark to give money to a friend of hers to pay a fine but the woman spends it on cocaine instead and ends up being brought in with an overdose. Duffy realises that someone has been stealing painkillers. An elderly woman who was dumped by her family turns up and Adams gets her a bed in geriatrics. An older woman having an affair with a married man has an angina attack; her daughter and son-in-law are annoyed that she has an endowment policy in her lover's name but she insists she wants to provide for all the people that she loves. Amy finds an abandoned cat and Tina and Sunny find a home for it. Guest starring Andrew Milner, Paul Slack and Jean Boht
242	16	"Making a Difference"	Alan Wareing	Andrew Rattenbury	12 December 1998	12.31
Josh and Penny are taking a man with an angina attack to the hospital when they collide at the lights with a car in which three youths are joyriding. The driver is trapped and Josh stays to treat him while Penny gets their patient to Casualty. He claims Penny went through a red light but Josh tricks him into admitting that he did. The other two youths go to the garage where the ex-girlfriend of one of them works; she claims to be dating her supervisor but in fact he is seeing the manager's daughter. A fight breaks out in which one of the youths injures his arm and the manager's daughter gets paint stripper thrown in her face. When the youths turn up at the hospital, the manager chases them and hits one with a piece of wood, unaware it has a nail in it. Mark operates on him when Sean admits he doesn't know the procedure and explains about his time as a medical student. Pam visits Mark and breaks up with him. George and Duffy learn Roberts is sending his private patients to the department as outpatients; Max tells him to stop. Sam learns Lee is the one stealing drugs. Lee threatens to reveal Adam is HIV positive so Sam tells him he'll keep quiet if Lee leaves and never comes back. Guest starring Simon Armstrong, Vivienne Moore, Johann Myers and Peter Laird
243	17	"Miracle on Casualty"	Michael Owen Morris	Tony McHale	19 December 1998	12.62
A young single mother leaves her baby alone while she goes to the shops but some friends convince her to go to a pub quiz with them. Three academics turn up and win all the prizes, upsetting the locals who start a fight in which the young woman is injured. She convinces Josh and Penny to take her home quickly, where she finds a neighbour looking after the baby; Max convinces Social Services to go easy on her. The academics decide to give their prize money back to the pub and give the toys they won to Amy. The police bring in a man dressed as Santa Claus; he tries to escape disguised as surgeon and nearly talks George into letting him go but Charlie stops him. A man who is meant to be going to Africa is moody with his wife and young daughter, causing his daughter to suffer a panic attack. Mark works out it is a reaction to malaria tablets. He tells Max he is going to finish his training and also tries to win George back. At a staff Christmas party, Tina tells Chloe that she is dating Sean, Charlie confronts Sam after realising Lee was behind the drug thefts and Max tells Duffy Frank is missing. Penny realises Josh has been lying about having a girlfriend and Josh is later confronted by a group of heavies. Amy leaves the party after going into labour and Sunny has to deliver baby Milo in a petrol station. Guest starring Stephen Moore, Ram John Holder and Emma Tate
244	18	"New Year and All That"	Paul Wroblewski	Tony McHale	26 December 1998	12.08
Amy brings Milo to see everyone at the hospital, where the staff are having to cope with her abrasive stand-in Monica. A male stripper who comes in with a cut leg turns out to have a brain haemorrhage and needs urgent surgery. Josh and Penny are confronted by the heavies who beat Josh up; Josh admits he has gambling debts. The heavies vandalise his flat and steal his car; Josh confides in Charlie. A man, Ryan, leaves his children sleeping in the car with a farewell note. One of them then knocks the handbrake off, causing the car to roll into some rocks. Frank runs into a friend Alison, who is carrying her newborn baby in a bag and abandons it outside the hospital, where it is found by Duffy and Monica. They all end up at a hostel run by Eve, Gerry and a Rumanian man, Marius. Ryan attacks Alison when she takes a photo of his children and stabs Frank when he tries to protect her. Frank is rushed to hospital where Max has to operate on him. Ryan takes Alison, who is having an asthma attack, hostage and asks Eve to drive him to the hospital; he has been on a downward spiral since his wife walked out on the family. Instead she takes them to the hospital where Ryan surrenders himself after Josh tells him his children survived the crash. Alison sees her baby and admits to being the mother. Mark finds an elderly man playing the harmonica in reception and later sees him laying flowers in a cubicle; it is the anniversary of his wife's death. Sean confides in Chloe that he thinks Tina is taking their relationship too seriously. George learns Mark is leaving to retrain and is angry that he rekindled their relationship knowing he was leaving, breaking things off with him. Guest starring Ian Sharrock, Amelia Lowdell and Louis Morgan Mark Grace departs
245	19	"Trapped"	Claire Winyard	Tony McHale	9 January 1999	9.60
Marius is brought in and diagnosed with Crohn's disease. Max is worried that he doesn't have medical insurance and Eve admits she married him so he could have treatment; he was tortured after being arrested at a civil rights protest. Max visits a recovering Frank and they reconcile. A boy, Kieran, has been shot as a result of drug wars on a council estate and is taken to hospital. Residents association leader Simon stirs up a mob to confront local dealer Johnstone, giving him a minor beating before he is arrested. He turns out to be a haemophiliac and Josh and Penny are called but the mob is outside the police station and they can't leave. Charlie sends Sean and Chloe to help out. Kieran's friend Nicola tells Simon that he was working for Johnstone, not an innocent bystander, but Simon refuses to call things off. When the news arrive that Kieran has died, the mob attack the ambulance as it is leaving and Nicola is trampled. Kieran's mother Karen arrives with a gun she found in his room and fires into the air, ending the protest; Johnstone and Nicola are rushed to hospital. Chloe is disgusted that Pat didn't care if Johnstone died. She and Sean comfort each other and kiss. Guest starring Billy Geraghty, Rakie Ayola and Nicholas Bailey
246	20	"White Lies, White Wedding"	Robert Bailey	Jeff Povey	16 January 1999	11.84
A groom wakes up on his wedding day to find he has been left in a boat in the middle of a river. Trying to get out, he falls into the water. He is rescued by his brother and best man and has to be taken to hospital to have his stomach pumped. The bride is pregnant and the brother believes they are only getting married because of the baby but refuses Sean's advice to tell the bride he loves her himself. A canteen lady collapses in front of Sam and Adam and turns out to have had a stroke. Chloe is upset, since she has been leaning on the older woman since her mother's death. Adam tries to find a bed for her but fails and she dies in a cubicle. He later learns Roberts kept seven beds empty for his patients and Max angrily confronts him. Sean tells Chloe they should forget about their night together. He learns Eve and Marius are married and tells the staff. Amy asks Sunny to be Milo's godfather. Josh is tempted when a patient gives him a racing tip. Two students argue on a field trip to a zoo and cause their professor to fall from a high tower; at the hospital, he is revealed to be Adam's father Kamal. He is taken up to theatre and Adam is left waiting for news. Guest starring Andrew Livingston, Paul Heasman, Shaun Parkes and Jon Croft
247	21	"Team Work"	Michael Owen Morris	Patrick Wilde	23 January 1999	12.10
Adam learns that his father might need a kidney transplant and knows he will be approached as a donor. He tells first the consultant and then his parents about his HIV status and sexuality; they seem to be accepting. Milton tells Max that either Holby or St Thomas A&E will be closed. He wants Max to finish a research paper on MI screening to give them a better chance and Max asks George to help with research. The staff are anticipating casualties from a cup tie. One supporter is meant to be going with his son but finds a stranger sitting next to him; he bought his son's ticket outside the ground. The father goes home and gets into an argument with his son. Penny later turns up to find the son badly injured; the father claims he found him like that. He later admits to Max that his son has been drunk and violent since his mother died, and he fought back for the first time. Max helps get them talking again. Wyvern Tigers' star player turns up hungover but the manager knows there is a scout in the crowd and wants to sell him to raise money. He gets another player to spike his drink with amphetamines, then gets the physio to give him painkillers after he injures his knee. The player suffers a heart attack after scoring a penalty. The hospital staff don't understand why he doesn't improve until they find out about the drugs. He will recover but will probably never play again. Pat comes in after being punched by a supporter and Tina convinces him and Chloe to make up. Guest starring Nicholas Tizzard, Tony Bluto and Andrew Robertson
248	22	"Human Traffic"	Philippa Langdale	Jeff Povey	30 January 1999	11.49
A Russian bride gets the news that she has been granted British citizenship. Her husband goes to pick up her brother from the airport but learns he is actually her ex-fiancé. They are involved in a minor car accident when a fox runs out in front of them. At the hospital, the ex-fiancé asks the bride to come back to him but she insists she loves her husband. However, when she learns that he is only interested in a pretend marriage, she slips away without speaking to either of them. A woman with an injured ankle is angry about being kept waiting. Sean insists on doing an x-ray and she is annoyed that it turns out to be just a sprain, but changes her mind when the x-ray shows a tumour. A man picks his daughter, who has been travelling in Thailand, up from the airport and is shocked to learn she has married a middle-aged British man that she has only known three months. He later collapses and is discovered to have swallowed packets of drugs one of which has split; he dies. His wife tells her father she knew nothing about it, but when he tells her to pretend they weren't married she instead tells the police she was in on it and is arrested. Charlie helps Eve get Marius a job as a cleaner. Guest starring Alan David, Brian Hibbard, Bruce Alexander and Clare Calbraith
249	23	"Mother's Day"	Julian Holmes	Christopher Reason	6 February 1999	12.09
A fireman is pressured to cut a dead body free after a car smash and accidentally slices his leg with the cutting tool. At the hospital, his parents visit him and his mother seems horrified when he reveals his girlfriend is pregnant. Marius notices a tremor in the fireman's arm and Eve convinces Sean to look into it. Max dismisses the possibility of Huntington's disease since neither parent has it but his mother admits to Sean that neither her husband nor her son know that her son's real father was her old boss who died of Huntington's: Now he may have passed it on to his own child. Sean looks after a boy who swallowed some pills and ends up throwing up over him. A woman says goodbye to her adopted mother before going to meet her birth mother for the first time. Afterwards, the adopted mother collapses from chest pains. Max and George realise she could be a good case study for their research but both she and her daughter refuse permission. They change their mind when they learn it simply involves running tests on her blood sample, by which time Max has gone home and George has to miss her son's parents evening to look after things. Josh and Penny are asked to take an elderly patient home; Josh seems to be avoiding a Gamblers Anonymous meeting. At her house, they find she has all £10,000 of her husband's life insurance in the fridge, which she intends to leave to her estranged son and his family. Josh attends the meeting and admits his problem. Guest starring June Watson, Mary Jo Randle and Sue Cleaver
250	24	"Face Value"	Nigel Douglas	Graham Mitchell	13 February 1999	13.09
A retired nurse comes in with chest pains. George wants to use him as a test subject but he insists it is just a pulled muscle. Sam talks George out of discharging him and he is later revived after having a second heart attack in the cubicle. Josh and Penny go to a demolition site, where a young couple who were squatting there have been trapped by a collapse. The boy is taken away in a second ambulance while Josh and Penny put the girl on a spinal board; however, the floor gives way as they are carrying her out, leaving all three trapped under rubble. Pat is at the hospital and recognises the boy: He has been reported for abducting the girl, who is only fifteen. Max goes to the site where a rescue attempt leaves Penny injured and Becky with a badly bleeding foot; Max directs Josh to correct it. They are finally taken to the hospital where the boy reveals the girl's stepfather was abusing her but she doesn't want her mum to know. Josh and Sunny turn a blind eye to him slipping away while his police guard is distracted and he asks Josh to tell the girl he'll come back for her. Guest starring D.D. Sandiford, Joseph Kpobie, David Hounslow and Roy Barraclough
251	25	"Crazy Love"	Roberto Bangura	Susan Boyd	20 February 1999	12.61
A young man is brought in after being beaten up and his two friends leave without speaking to the police. They go to a disco where the thugs that attacked them before turn up and start a riot. They are chased to the hospital where one of them is badly beaten and Duffy is injured trying to help out. The thugs are arrested. A mentally backward man thinks his wife is leaving him when he finds a bag she put out for the jumble and goes berserk. The police are called and end up using CS spray on him before taking him to hospital. He befriends Josh, who is doing a refresher course. Charlie is concerned by his wife's cough and Sean realises she has TB. Tina is fed up of Sean's moods and breaks up with him. Max is frustrated at George's lack of progress with the research and George admits to Duffy she is considering applying for a job at Broadway General. An amnesiac man is brought in by a neighbour who only knows him by sight after hitting his head. He remembers his address and gives her his keys. It is some time before she returns to reveal who he is; he lives with his parents and she had to explain the situation to them. Adam finds a piece of paper Milton left in the photocopier and shows it to Charlie: He has been offered the CEO's job at St Thomas'. Eve is upset when Marius tells her he's going back to Romania. Guest starring Michael Seacock, Craig Heaney, Charles Dale, Lesley Nicol, Charlotte Bellamy and Phillip Joseph
252	26	"The Hardest Word"	Gill Wilkinson	Christopher Reason	27 February 1999	12.84
Max and Milton meet with the Raffertys and their solicitor; Milton offers them a £2,000 out of court settlement, a written apology and a memorial bench for Eugene. They reluctantly accept. While Max is absent, Sean examines a young boy brought in by his mother and realises he has had an allergic reaction to eggs. When the specialist is called away, Sean has to intubate. Anthony goes down to the department and punches Sean. Charlie wants him charged with assault but a speech from Max and an apology from Sean smooth things over and Charlie agrees to let the matter drop. Tina patches up Sean and he asks her out. Amy returns to work, bringing Milo with her, and Chloe acts oddly around him. A woman is going with her husband and daughter to visit her mother, who she has a tense relationship with, on her birthday. They arrive to find the mother collapsed in the bathroom; she has had a brain haemorrhage. Her daughter sits with her in the cubicle as she dies, making her peace. Duffy convinces Charlie to leak news of Milton's dealings to the press. Guest starring Brigid Zengeni, Lois Harvey and Melanie Gutteridge
253	27	"Love Over Gold – Part One"	Gary Love	Chris Murray	6 March 1999	10.04
Sean and Chloe treat Julie, a young woman with an ectopic pregnancy. Charlie shows a journalist, Helen, around the department and denies knowledge of a closure. Max speaks to George about the Broadway job but she leaves to collect Tom before he can finish speaking. A teenager, Evan, is planning to go poaching and his younger brother Dominic helps him get things ready. Dominic injures his hand and their father, Bob, takes him to hospital. On their return, they run into the gamekeeper, Bowden, who warns them off. Brothers Gil and Conor and their friend Eric are robbing a bank, aided by Gil's girlfriend Kay, who is a cashier. Everything goes smoothly until a new customer, Derek, refuses to obey instructions. Eric opens fire wildly, injuring both Derek and Conor, and most of the hostages flee in the confusion. Conor's girlfriend Tilly, who was meant to be their getaway driver, drives off in a panic and crashes into a florist's. George goes in to help the injured; cashier Rhonda and young couple Paul and Sarah are still held hostage. The police surround the bank and Gil releases Derek in exchange for medical supplies but takes Josh hostage instead. He later releases Sarah, who has a heart condition, in return for being allowed to leave with the hostages in an ambulance. En route, Eric is thrown out the back of the vehicle. Sean asks Tina to move in with him and she agrees. The robbers and their hostages head into the woods where Bowden and his men are laying a trap for the poachers. Gil points his gun at George and Paul when they argue with him. Conor points his gun at Gil. Guest starring Nicola Mycroft, Nick Brimble, Nicola Stapleton, Jimmy Flint, Jamie Foreman, Glen Murphy and Trevor Laird
254	28	"Love Over Gold – Part Two"	Gary Love	Andrew Rattenbury	13 March 1999	9.65
Conor and Gil put their guns away and Gil and Kay take Josh out into the woods to help them bury the money. Paul admits to George that the robbery stopped Sarah finding out he had spent all their money on a car. At the hospital, Commander Turner attempts to interrogate Tilly. Sam gets her to tell him that the woods was their back-up rendezvous. The police and ambulance crews head out there, picking up Eric en route and taking him to hospital. Both Bob and Dominic follow Evan to the woods, where Evan and his friends pour cyanide into the river to kill the fish. Bowden turns on his searchlights, confusing the situation. Kay tackles Gil when it seems he is about to kill Josh, who runs off. Evan's dinghy capsizes and he swallows some of the poisoned water; Bob takes him to hospital. Dominic falls and impales himself on a branch; Bowden takes him to the ambulances but he and Bob remain enemies. The hostages are found with Kay and Conor, who surrender quietly. Gil is later found by Turner trying to gather up the scattered money. George finds Tom at the hospital, having been dropped off by the childminder, and tells Max she is leaving, only saying a brief farewell to Amy. Chloe tells Tina she is pregnant and Tina realises Sean is the father. With the press leak, Milton is forced to announce that Holby A&E is staying open and will get another senior doctor. Williams, a man who was looking for his wife earlier, attacks Sam and Adam on the mezzanine after hearing them joking about him. Sam is pushed off the balcony. Guest starring Dax O'Callaghan, Nick Brimble, Nicola Stapleton, Jimmy Flint, Jamie Foreman, Glen Murphy and Trevor Laird

== Bibliography ==
- Silver, Rachel (1998). Casualty: Behind The Scenes. BBC Worldwide. ISBN 0-563-38467-0.
