= Casualty series 14 =

Fourteenth series of Casualty

Casualty
- Series 14
- Starring: Donna Alexander; Jan Anderson; Pal Aron; Ian Bleasdale; Michelle Butterly; Claire Goose; Robert Gwilym; Sandra Huggett; Ian Kelsey; Jonathan Kerrigan; Kwame Kwei-Armah; Gerald Kyd; Barbara Marten; Ronnie McCann; Vincenzo Pellegrino; Cathy Shipton; Derek Thompson; Rebecca Wheatley
- No. of episodes: 30

Release
- Original network: BBC One
- Original release: 18 September 1999 – 25 March 2000

Series chronology
- ← Previous; Series 13 Next → Series 15

The fourteenth series of the British medical drama television series Casualty commenced airing in the United Kingdom on BBC One on 18 September 1999 and finished on 25 March 2000.

== Production ==
Alexei de Keyser took over from Johnathan Young as producer for this series, stating in TVTimes "Casualty is the brand leader in medical drama and I am confident this series will keep it there." The episode count increased to 30 this series and included 3 two-parter episodes.

In the series opener, "Calm Before the Storm", the story arc continues immediately after the events in the series 13 finale, where Sam continues to fight for his life. The two parts of "Calm Before the Storm" and "Benny and the Vets" aired on consecutive Saturday and Sunday nights, whereas the two parts of "Being There" aired a week apart.

Changes to the set were made for this series, creating a longer and wider entrance corridor plus a new 'resus' area. The old resus became a dedicated paediatric resus. The new resus is first seen in episode 10.

In the two-part series finale "Being There", Tina follows Sean to Australia in pursuit of love. The episodes marked the first occasion Casualty was filmed outside the United Kingdom, with location shoots taking place in Sydney and Alice Springs. Whilst filming in Australia, Claire Goose admitted to being in a constant state of worry over the presence of scorpions and brown snakes.

== Cast ==
=== Overview ===
The fourteenth series of Casualty features a cast of characters working in the emergency department of Holby City Hospital. The series begins with 13 roles receiving star billing, which is an increase from the previous series. Robert Gwilym stars as emergency medicine consultant and clinical director Max Gallagher and Gerald Kyd appears as senior house officer Sean Maddox. Derek Thompson continues his role as charge nurse Charlie Fairhead while Barbara Marten portrays sister Eve Montgomery. Cathy Shipton features as Lisa "Duffy" Duffin, a senior staff nurse who is promoted to sister. Jan Anderson, Claire Goose and Jonathan Kerrigan star as staff nurses Chloe Hill, Tina Seabrook and Sam Colloby. Pal Aron appears as bed manager Adam Osman, who is later hired as a staff nurse. Ian Bleasdale and Donna Alexander portray paramedics Josh Griffiths and Penny Hutchens. Rebecca Wheatley stars her role as Amy Howard and Vincenzo Pellegrino features as Derek "Sunny" Sunderland. Susan Cookson also continues her semi-regular role as nurse Julie Day.

Sandra Huggett joins the cast in episode 1 as Holly Miles, a senior house officer. Kerrigan departs in episode 5 after receiving an offer to star in ITV series Reach for the Moon and a desire to pursue other projects. Pellegrino makes his final appearance in episode 7 and Marten exits in episode 8. Michelle Butterly and Kwame Kwei-Armah debut in episode 9 as paramedics Mel Dyson and Fin Newton respectively. Ronnie McCann made his first appearance as staff nurse Barney Woolfe in episode 12, while Ian Kelsey joins the cast in episode 15 as Patrick Spiller, a specialist registrar in emergency medicine. Ben Keaton guest appeared in episodes 16 and 18 as Spencer, a role he would reprise in the following series. Holby City character Julie Fitzjohn, portrayed by Nicola Stephenson, guest starred in episode 17. In December 1999, Goose announced her plans to leave the series. Kyd also chose to leave after becoming disheartened with his character. Goose and Kyd's characters depart in episode 30 in scenes filmed in Australia.

=== Main characters ===
- Donna Alexander as Penny Hutchens
- Jan Anderson as Chloe Hill
- Pal Aron as Adam Osman
- Ian Bleasdale as Josh Griffiths
- Michelle Butterly as Mel Dyson (from episode 9)
- Claire Goose as Tina Seabrook (until episode 30)
- Robert Gwilym as Max Gallagher
- Sandra Huggett as Holly Miles (from episode 1)
- Ian Kelsey as Patrick Spiller (from episode 15)
- Jonathan Kerrigan as Sam Colloby (until episode 5)
- Kwame Kwei-Armah as Fin Newton (from episode 9)
- Gerald Kyd as Sean Maddox (until episode 30)
- Barbara Marten as Eve Montgomery (until episode 8)
- Ronnie McCann as Barney Woolfe (from episode 12)
- Vincenzo Pellegrino as Derek "Sunny" Sunderland (until episode 7)
- Cathy Shipton as Lisa "Duffy" Duffin
- Derek Thompson as Charlie Fairhead
- Rebecca Wheatley as Amy Howard

=== Recurring and guest characters ===
- Sam Barriscale as Reuben Hurst (episode 18)
- Sharon Bower as Joan Gallagher (episodes 23 and 24)
- Susan Cookson as Julie Day (until episode 30)
- Ian Fitzgibbon as Jon Crowe (episodes 19−23)
- Grahame Fox as Jonathan Lewis (episodes 14 and 24)
- Michael J. Jackson as Mike Branscombe (episodes 6 and 7)
- Ben Keaton as Spencer (episodes 16 and 18)
- Ian Keith as Gary Milton (episode 4)
- Tobias Menzies as Frank Gallagher (episodes 18−23)
- Tanya Myers as Joanne Foster (episodes 27−30)
- Greg Prentice as Jake Foster (episodes 27−30)
- Doraly Rosen as Angie Lynch (episodes 19−24)
- Morag Siller as Leona (from episode 23)
- Nicola Stephenson as Julie Fitzjohn (episode 17)
- Darren Tighe as Matt Tyler (episodes 19−23)
- Jade Williams as Gemma Foster (episodes 27−30)

== Episodes ==
No. overall	No. in series	Title	Directed by	Written by	Original release date	UK viewers (millions)
255	1	"Calm Before the Storm – Part One"	Paul Wroblewski	Simon Mirren	18 September 1999	11.90
Sam is rushed into Resus; the staff are all devastated by his injury, especially Tina. Charlie meets with SHO Holly Miles, who Max has had sent down as cover. She looks after Jamie, a boy who has been hiding under the reception desk since seeing Sam fall. Gerry arrives with an arm injury: He fractured his arm from a minor blow and Max tells Eve his bones could have been weakened by cancer. Holly and Chloe look after Albert, an older man who is accompanied by his nephew Eddie. Eve and Gerry recognise Eddie from the centre and worry Albert has only taken him in for the allowance. Sean learns of Chloe's pregnancy. A marine, Jack, is arrested by Military Police after assaulting Oliver, an officer who was sleeping with his wife. Oliver later dies in hospital so the MPs prepare to transfer him to civil authorities on murder charges. Poppy, a girl with leukaemia, tries to make her mother Suzy accept she might die. When Poppy falls asleep while they are driving, Suzy is worried and clashed into the military vehicle. One of the escort is killed and the other is knocked out. Jack helps Poppy get an unconscious Suzy out of the car before it explodes. Fisherman Danny is offered £2000 by his brother Alan to help him dump some chemicals. It is only after he has been splattered with it than Danny learns it is radioactive waste. They are pursued by Stan, a river policeman, and crash into the wharf. Josh and Penny arrive to collect an injured Danny. Penny is distracted when she sees Alan slipping away and falls into the water. Guest starring Lloyd Owen, Iain Cuthbertson and Vincent Pickering Note: Trailer for next episode introduced
256	2	"Calm Before the Storm – Part Two"	Paul Wroblewski	Simon Mirren	19 September 1999	12.37
Penny is rescued by Stan. En route to the hospital, she and Josh stumble across the car crash and call for another ambulance. Jack is assumed to be Poppy's father. Suzy is taken to Holby City but the ambulance containing the surviving MP is diverted. Alan turns up to tell them about the radioactive waste; Danny is already in Resus and the staff have handled the waste. Charlie calls Professor Bains: Resus is quarantined and Sunny locks up the department, leaving Eddie outside. Albert talks to him through the window and promises to look after him but then dies of a heart attack. Tina tells the staff of Chloe's pregnancy so she'll be allowed out of Resus. Sean and Tina put in a chest drain on Suzy under Max's direction. Danny needs a CT scan and neurosurgery but the staff are unable to take him out of Resus so he dies. Holly gives Jamie some penicillin after his brothers misinform her about his allergies and she and Chloe have to help him through an allergic reaction. Charlie and Amy work out who Jack is but he stays with Poppy and surrenders to the police after the quarantine is lifted, leaving everyone to go through decontamination. Guest starring Lloyd Owen, Iain Cuthbertson, Derek Griffiths and Vincent Pickering
257	3	"Truth or Dare"	Julian Holmes	Tony McHale	25 September 1999	11.47
A teacher brings in a 12-year-old pupil who fell and hit her head. She admits to Sunny that the girl pulled a knife on her in detention and she pushed her. She reveals the truth to the girl's father, who understands and agrees to work with her. Rival sales teams are taking part in an outward bound exercise. The reigning champion learns one of his team spent the night in the bar so tries to slow down his rival by sabotaging the harness on a rope bridge but the rival uses it without doing the checks and falls to his death. The other team members report their leader, who is arrested. Chloe finds an old man in reception with memory problems and learns he has been taking tablets for impotence which have amnesia as a side effect; she, Eve and Amy learn he is a baronet with a much younger wife. A woman is supposed to be babysitting her sister's children but instead sleeps with her sister's husband. Unsupervised, the children spill paint over themselves and then injure themselves trying to get it off with scouring pads. The mother, realising the full story, decides to take a promotion in Edinburgh and leave the cheating couple behind. Adam visits Sam, who is recovering in ITU, and tells him he is thinking of going back to nursing; he also asks Charlie about vacancies. Gerry tells Eve he has terminal cancer and is questioning his faith. Sean tells Chloe he'll give her financial support whatever she decides to do but won't help with the baby. Guest starring Carina Reeves, Tim Farraday, Mark Straker, Terence Alexander and Martyn Read
258	4	"Words and Deeds"	Roberto Bangura	Ben Cooper	2 October 1999	11.28
Tina is now back living with Sunny, who turns up late; Sam is away convalescing at a friend's house. Sunny nearly gets into a fight with a man who parked his car in a restricted area, which Josh defuses. Charlie examines a man who has signs of previous surgery but no symptoms, suspecting he is a hospital hopper. He coughs up blood but Holly does a check and learns his story of a referral is a lie and he has been using fake blood bags; he is thrown out. Adam talks to Charlie about his nursing application and admits he is HIV positive; Charlie tells him he will have to declare it but won't be automatically excluded. A man, Nick, is released from prison. His brother Paul and friend Gilbert tell him his girlfriend won't let him see his daughter unless he proves himself. They get him a job at a building site but he uses a crane without a license. The foreman, Barry, threatens to report him so he crushes his car and then pushes him out of the cab. A young woman, Chrissie, tells her mother Joan she's been banned from driving. Joan offers to help out and takes Chrissie's son Jack out in her car. Nick causes trouble at the hospital and drives off erratically. At roadworks, he goes through when the light is on red but still crashes into Joan coming the other way, injuring Paul and Jack. Nick causes trouble again and is thrown out. When he tries to force his way back in, Sunny punches him. Paul dies of his injuries. Max and Sean learn Joan has eyesight problems and shouldn't have been driving; she tells the police the accident was her fault. Charlie, whose attempt to get Milton to bring in more security has been affected, tells Sunny he has no choice but to suspend him pending an investigation. Guest starring Jamie Newall, Matthew Dunster and Nicholas Tizzard
259	5	"Crossroads"	Gill Wilkinson	Tony McHale	9 October 1999	11.09
A teenage boy, Jimmy, is brought in by his mother after taking an overdose of paracetamol; she insists it was an accident. Jimmy's father turns up; Jimmy is a violinist but his father refuses to go and see him play. Adam hands in his application while Charlie is away; Duffy reads it and believes his HIV status would make him a liability. However, she changes her mind when Adam finds Jimmy on the roof contemplating suicide; Jimmy says his father shut his hand in a car door to stop him playing and Adam convinces him to confront him. One of the builders refitting the department is distracted by a phone call and cuts his finger off. Sean and Chloe patch him up and send him to have it reattached. His wife turns up, worrying that his constant nights out mean he is having an affair: In fact, he has taken a second job to buy them a holiday to the Canary Islands. Sunny persuades Tina to accompany him to track down Sam, who is in Cornwall with Simon, his former teacher and the first person he confided in about being gay. Sunny and Sam nearly get into a fight but Simon convinces Sam to go back and face his fears. En route, their coach plays a minor role in a pile-up caused by a drunk driver. The trio perform triage and Sam does emergency surgery on the driver's girlfriend. Knowing that he isn't afraid anymore, Sam decides to resign anyway. Guest starring Russ Abbot, John MacKay and Aidan David
260	6	"Lost Souls"	Gill Wilkinson	Andrew Rattenbury	16 October 1999	11.23
Paramedic Mike brings in a man who fell off a ladder, who keeps insisting his injury is worse than it is; Josh and Duffy both notice Mike seems permanently tired. Max arranges for a mechanic to fix Duffy's car. Runaway couple Drew and Katie give their friends Rohan and Kwame a lift in a van. Rohan ignores Drew's instructions and lights a cigarette while around flammable materials, starting a fire. Rohan is badly burned and Drew and Katie burn their hands helping them. Drew's mother Maggie and Katie's father Doug are looking for them and encounter Kwame. Doug tries to get Kwame to tell him where the couple are but Kwame is hit by a lorry. Katie sees Doug at the hospital and briefly talks to him, promising to stay in touch. Holly accompanies Maggie to the squat where the couple are staying but they have already moved on. Gerry has been brought in and Sean realises he only has days to live. Eve deliberately hastens his death by increasing his morphine dose but feels guilty when his sister turns up too late to see him before he died. Guest starring Denise Black, Stuart Fox and James Carlton
261	7	"Everybody Hurts"	Robert Del Maestro	Katharine Way	23 October 1999	10.81
A hospital chaplain who Eve earlier confessed to meets with one of his altar boys and his mother; the boy has asthma and is at the hospital for tests. The boy's friends convince him to break into the church but he leaves his inhaler behind and has a severe asthma attack, dying in hospital. The priest admits the boy was his son; he offers to leave the church for the mother but she tells him it's too late. Charlie organises Sunny's disciplinary hearing; both Charlie and the union rep try to make excuses for him but Sunny is fed up of the dangerous conditions they are expected to work in and resigns. Chloe tells Duffy that she has booked a termination and since her falling out with Tina she has no-one to talk to. Holly finds Maggie pinning up posters around hospital. She later encounters an elderly woman who is scared to leave the hospital: She hasn't been outside in three years and was brought there in an ambulance. Holly feigns injury to lure her outside. Penny finds Mike moonlighting as a minicab driver and tells Josh, who tells Mike to stop. Mike agrees when he nearly falls asleep while driving and Josh tells him to take the rest of the day off, but Mike again falls asleep at the wheel and crashes and dies. Eve organises the staff nurse interviews and gives the job to Adam, annoying Duffy, but the experience leaves her even more certain she shouldn't be a nurse anymore. Guest starring Jack Baverstock, Larry Lamb and Denise Black
262	8	"Seeing the Light"	Alan Wareing	Katharine Way	30 October 1999	9.12
Drew brings in a workmate from a building site with an eye injury, who is given an eyepatch and told to stay off work. However, the foreman insists he go back to work straight away and he is later brought back in covered with boiling tar, having walked into a stream that he couldn't see; he should survive but will probably be disabled. Drew burned his hands trying to help and Holly calls Maggie to see him; neither are happy with Holly's interference but agree to stay in touch. A young woman is brought in by her sister; she took an overdose after they had an argument. When she is revived, she reports having a near death experience. It's Adam's first shift as a nurse and he has to deal with one of a group of drunk medical stunts who fell and hit his head. Adam sees him have a seizure and alerts Sean. The patient disappears and Adam tracks him down; he admits he's been having the seizures for a while and worries that he has a brain tumour. Adam tells him it's probably epilepsy and gets him to think more positively, earning Duffy's approval. Duffy learns that Chloe's booked in for an abortion after her shift and tells Tina; Tina repairs their friendship and accompanies Chloe to the appointment. Eve walks out mid-shift, clearing her locker. Charlie tracks her down to the church and she tells him she's going to leave nursing to run Gerry's mission. Guest starring Denise Black, James Carlton and Sharon Duncan-Brewster
263	9	"Off the Wall"	Paul Wroblewski	Len Collin	6 November 1999	8.52
A fly-on-the-wall documentary crew are following two ambulances for the day and film Josh and Penny visiting Mike's memorial. Tina is accompanying Mike's replacement Finlay Newton and his new partner Mel Dyson for the day, while Holly and Duffy worry about how the hospital will look. The teams are filmed dealing with several minor incidents: Tina, Fin and Mel treat an old man with earache and a girl who has been burned by a firework while Josh and Penny look after an old woman bitten by her pet rat and have their attempts to help a wheelchair-using man having an epileptic seizure hampered by his aggressive dog. Fin's group help a man who put his back out having sex with a woman in the back of a car and are later called to the woman's house where her husband has beaten her up; Holly, Duffy and Fin get the woman and her lover talking. Both ambulances are called to a major incident at a building site: A crane driver has suffered a heart attack and dropped blocks on the men below, causing several casualties. Penny has to climb up the crane with the fire crew to treat the driver and all casualties are delivered safely to hospital. Guest starring Anthony J. Crocker, Richard Cole and Jonathan Wrather
264	10	"Benny and the Vets – Part One"	Julian Holmes	Chris Murray	13 November 1999	8.62
A new Resus is opened: The first patient is Niall, a boy who has bitten the heads off his father's toy soldiers. Another boy, Troy, is with his father Mick on his birthday when he falls off his skateboard. At the hospital, Sean notices he has a temperature but Charlie discharges him. Troy is late to a birthday party being thrown by his mother Val, prompting an argument between his parents until Troy throws up over the birthday cake. Sean briefly runs into his grandfather Ernest in reception. Benny, who has obsessive compulsive disorder, gets into a row with his daughter Mary and her husband Mitch and puts his arm through a window. At the hospital, he anxiously sends his wife Beth away: She has cancer and he is worried about her being exposed to germs. He obsessively scrubs his arm in the toilet, pulling out his stitches. Two animal rights activists, Clyde and Ronnie, are making a bomb when Clyde is injured by a minor explosion. Clyde claims it was a firework and tells Holly and Tina he doesn't want treatment tested on animals. They are planning to blow up an experimental lab; Ronnie works in the canteen there and Clyde works as a courier. Lab technician Nat meets with his wife Martha; he has a close but platonic relationship with work colleague Jenny. Ronnie sets off the fire alarm but Nat stays behind and refuses to leave when Clyde sets the bomb. Clyde tries to defuse it but it goes off. Duffy interviews for the sister's job and Max gives her a hard time. Afterwards, he tells her she has the job and Charlie sees them getting passionate on his desk. Guest starring Jonathan Ryland, Cathy Murphy, Ian Lavender, Shirley Stelfox, John Flanagan and Peter Copley
265	11	"Benny and the Vets – Part Two"	Julian Holmes	Chris Murray	14 November 1999	10.14
Duffy and Max stop before they go too far. Sean and Adam look after Benny and tell him Beth's tumour was benign. Beth defends Benny to Mary, saying his condition comes out of his love for her, but later uses Mary's arguments to convince Benny to see a psychotherapist. Troy comes in and is found to have meningitis. Val reluctantly calls Mick and they resolve to be better parents. Jenny pretends to be Nat's wife to go in the ambulance with him and sits with him until Martha arrives. Nat has been blinded by the explosion and Martha reveals she is pregnant. Duffy and Adam discover a security guard, Ray, fractured his neck and Holly gives him a collar. Clyde is identified as the bomber. Ronnie learns of his injury on the news and rushes to hospital, telling the staff to use animal-tested products to save him, but there is nothing they can do anyway and she sits with him as he dies. Fin gets talking to Ernest, who planned to visit the grave of a friend killed in 1918 with Sean for a minute's silence at eleven o'clock. Fin leads the department in having a minute's silence at three o'clock instead. Tina and Sean agree to be friends. Jenny mentions to Duffy that she wishes something had happened with Nat when they'd had the chance. Duffy rings Andrew to say she has to work all night, then meets with Max. Guest starring Jonathan Ryland, Cathy Murphy, Ian Lavender, Shirley Stelfox, John Flanagan and Peter Copley
266	12	"Sins of the Mother"	Gill Wilkinson	Jeff Povey	20 November 1999	11.72
A farmer's wife is having an affair with one of the farmhands. Her young son puts weedkiller in the farmhand's drink but his mother ends up drinking it too and both of them end up in hospital from the poisoning. Max says social services will have to be informed. Duffy has spent the night with Max but the incident causes her to turn down a date with him; however, Charlie's disapproval threatens their friendship. New staff nurse Barney Woolfe has his first shift and immediately clashes with Adam, but they end up working together to diagnose a patient who has had a botfly lay its larvae in his neck. Holly and Adam treat a parachutist who injured his ankle avoiding a cow and it inspires Holly to organise a parachute jump to raise funds for Paeds Resus. A woman in her 40s burns her hand on a hob and her husband leaves her at the hospital. It turns out she has early onset senility and he has been looking after her alone for four years; Charlie convinces him to accept help. Guest starring David Royle, Phillippa Wilson and David Albion
267	13	"Looking After Number One"	Roberto Bangura	Nick Saltrese	27 November 1999	12.42
An elderly woman comes in with a fractured wrist. She claims it was from a fall but Holly and Tina notice the injury is consistent with being grabbed and suspect her husband. When a younger man is brought in with a head injury, it is revealed that he was their lodger and they caught him trying to rob him; he pushed the wife and the husband hit him with a golf club. Amy has to bring Milo in to work during a receptionist shortage and Chloe is uncomfortable having to look after him. Holly and Tina convince Max to take part in the sponsored parachute jump. A woman collapses at home and the man she was in bed with accompanies her to hospital. She admits to Adam that she is a prostitute and he is a regular client; she may be diabetic but, since she had unprotected sex with a customer, she is worried she has HIV. Adam tries to convince her to have tests and her client tries to convince her they can be a couple but she leaves. A uni student from a large family is manufacturing liquid ecstasy at home and selling it to pay his fees. His pre-teen brother drinks some and is rushed to hospital. His sister convinces him to reveal the truth and he is arrested. Duffy officially ends her affair with Max; Max blames Charlie and tells him their friendship is over. Guest starring Frank Mills, Rita Davies and Ken Bradshaw
268	14	"To Have and to Hold"	Dominic Lees	Sam Wheats	4 December 1999	10.37
Fin and Mel collect an elderly woman who has had a fall at home; she has broken her hip but also has hypothermia from the heating failing. The woman's well-off son comes round and argues with his father – father believes son is ashamed of them since they live in a council house, son is angry that father is too proud to accept help and the neighbours think he has abandoned them. Father agrees to spend Christmas with his family. A young boy whose mother recently left his father for another woman is brought in with abdominal pains. The father, Jonathan, arrives and Holly learns the boy damaged his testicle while playing football with his mother's girlfriend and was too embarrassed to say anything. It becomes clear he is aware of his mother's relationship and likes the girlfriend; they all resolve to make the best of it. A teenage girl, Emma, comes home to find her best friend Beccy in bed with her father. The two girls get into a fight and fall down some stairs. Beccy breaks her neck and is discovered to be pregnant. The father assumes she will have an abortion so the girls order him out of the hospital and decide to get a place together. Max realises Tina supported Chloe during her abortion and gives up on trying to get her and Sean back together. Guest starring Kathleen Byron, Brian Murphy and Fiona Bell
269	15	"Free Fall"	Michael Owen Morris	Andrew Rattenbury	11 December 1999	10.83
New registrar Patrick Spiller drives into work and causes a man to fall off his bike, injuring his ankle, only to drive on. Sean stops to help the man but when he tackles Patrick about it at work Patrick denies it. The man later suffers a cardiac arrest and Patrick resuscitates him, suggesting he was lucky to have the accident. Patrick runs into Holly and it is revealed they know each other from college, although Holly tries to pretend they are strangers. An elderly man with an aortic aneurysm is brought in: He has refused surgery and only wants to write a letter to his son James. His daughter Tania turns up but he claims he doesn't have a daughter. He dies in theatre and when Duffy tells Tania about the letter she explains she was James: Her father never accepted her as transgender, blaming himself for making "him" keep house after his mother died. A woman running a radio helpline receives a call from a depressed man who says his wife is never there for him and he's considered committing suicide. The producer cuts him off and the DJ collapses with a panic attack. At hospital, it turns out the caller was her husband using another name and they agree to try to be there for each other. Duffy smooths things over with Charlie and Max but they have a harder time making peace with each other. Max, Sean, Tina and Penny head off for the parachute jump but Sean gets his hand shut in a van door so Max has to partner Tina on the first jump. After landing, they kiss. Guest starring Grant Masters, Ingrid Lacey, Caroline Chikezie, Brian Miller and Tenniel Evans
270	16	"Just a Kiss"	Alan Wareing	Graham Mitchell	18 December 1999	11.23
A drunken homeless man, Spencer, is busking in reception. Sean and Barney try to get rid of him but he falls over the Christmas tree and injures his arm. A woman deliberately drives her car off a cliff, ending up halfway down the embankment. A jogger sees her and calls for help but injures his leg trying to reach her. Fin and Mel take him to hospital while Josh and Penny call for Max and Tina to join them at the scene to help the driver. She asks Tina to call her son and turns out to have taken an overdose of anti-depressants. Her son initially wants nothing to do with her – she walked out on him when he was three and only got back in touch recently – but eventually convinces her to have treatment. Patrick gives Holly a public dressing down for removing the jogger's collar without an x-ray; she admits to Sean that she dated him when she was a medical student and he was an SHO. The groom turns up late to a wedding, claiming his car broke down. At the wedding reception, several guests go down with food poisoning. The groom (apparently correctly) suspects his ex, who helped make the wedding cake, deliberately introduced germs to it. She reveals to his new wife that he came round hers the previous night admitting to second thoughts but the newlyweds are soon reconciled. Sean tries to get Tina to spend Christmas with him, provoking a jealous reaction from Max. Guest starring Barbara Ewing, Alan Westaway, Sally Knyvette and Fiona Welburn
271	17	"Peace on Earth"	Gill Wilkinson	Tony McHale	26 December 1999	9.16
Tina sees a young man, Noel, fall off a wall while walking into work and stays with him until the ambulance arrives. He turns out to have a fractured spine, meaning he will miss a business trip to New York with his girlfriend Ruth, and is taken up to Darwin. Holly is marking her birthday on Christmas Day. Max has been roped in to playing Santa on the children's ward with Adam and Chloe as elves. An older woman with motor neuron disease is brought in with pneumonia; her husband has been looking after her alone. She has asked him to help her die if it gets too bad but he is unable to go through with it and Holly arranges for them to spend Christmas alone. Barney has to deal with seven dwarves from a pantomime who are all showing signs of poisoning. Charlie works out it is arsenic; one of them brought a plant into their dressing room to cover up a hole he had drilled to spy on the actress playing Snow White, and used rat poison as fertiliser. Josh and Penny find a man holed up in a bunker, scared there will be a disaster at the Millennium. Josh coaxes him out by convincing him it is January and Patrick and Barney go along with the reception. Max and Tina get trapped in a lift and have sex. A drug addict, Steve, turns up at his brother Martin's house needing money. Martin has nothing but lets him stay there while his family are at church. Steve ransacks the place and causes a gas leak, which a neighbour later ignites by lighting a cigarette. The neighbour is killed and Martin's two sons are injured. Steve is later brought in after being found beaten and dumped in a car boot. Amy arranges for the family to stay at a motel and the staff have a whip round for them. Guest starring Damien Goodwin, George Waring, Steve Toussaint and Martina Laird
272	18	"The Morning After"	Tim Leandro	Christopher Reason	1 January 2000	11.96
Frank, who is now working as a drug counsellor, brings in one of his clients, Jacqui, who has lost her methadone. Max is sympathetic but tells him they can't hand out drugs. Jacqui later steals the drug box from Josh and Penny's ambulance. A diabetic man is at a cottage with his wife and her family. When the car fails to start, he goes up on the hill to get a mobile signal but the cold, a lack of food and an overdose of insulin cause him to fall into a diabetic coma. Josh and Penny arrive but don't have the drugs to treat him and have to patch up the ambulance to get him to hospital. He and his wife, who can't have children, decide to adopt. Frank finds Jacqui collapsed from an overdose and gets her to hospital. Max is awkward when Frank takes an interest in Tina but later tells Tina he loves her. Spencer and his friends bring in one of their number who is injured and camp out in reception celebrating the new year of every time zone. A young couple are involved in a car accident; the boy dies but the girl lives and his parents learn she is pregnant. Charlie asks Chloe to talk to them about organ donation. She handles it well and admonishes Spencer when he sprays the grieving couple with a water pistol during his celebrations. A dancer, Reuben, comes in with a sprained ankle and there is an instant attraction between him and Adam. Adam tells Reuben he is HIV positive; Reuben says he is as well and they arrange a date. Amy spends the shift worrying about Milo but when her mum brings him in she learns he has taken his first steps. Guest starring Harriet Thorpe, Andrew Scarborough, Geoffrey Hutchings and JoAnne Good
273	19	"Untouchable"	Alan Wareing	Katharine Way	9 January 2000	10.96
Frank finds one of his clients collapsed from an overdose. A fake paramedic, Fowler, turns up and tries to give him penicillin but Frank stops him. The addict later dies in hospital. Max and Tina are hiding their relationship but Max confides in Frank. Duffy overhears Tina discussing it with Chloe and tells her of her own affair with Max. Patrick and Adam treat a boy with ink poisoning from a homemade tattoo; Adam accuses Patrick of having a problem with his sexuality but a clearly uncomfortable Patrick denies it. A girl who is upset that her mother gives all the attention to her brother, who recently had a kidney transplant, poisons herself with foxgloves and has hallucinations. Fowler takes her to hospital before Josh and Penny turn up. The mother apologises to her. A woman collapses in the mall and Fowler gives her a penicillin injection; her husband thumps him and Josh gives the counteragent. Fowler is taken to hospital under police guard and tells Josh he nursed his terminally ill wife and has been using her (out of date) medication to try and help the service. Frank meets one of his clients, Angie, but can't give her any medication. She goes back to her usual dealers, Crowe and Tyler. She later mugs Adam outside the hospital; Chloe and Barney try to help him and he tells them he is HIV positive. Guest starring Tim Wylton, Deborah Findlay and Gemma Gregory
274	20	"Fall Out"	Ged Maguire	Ben Cooper	15 January 2000	12.14
Frank is frustrated that confidentiality means he has to keep quiet about Angie. Charlie and Barney assure Adam that his secret is safe but he thinks the staff are whispering about him so announces to the department that he is HIV positive and gay. Angie goes to see Crowe and Tyler but draws attention by trying to mug a woman for drugs money. Crowe and Tyler drive off, running her over. At the hospital, Adam recognises her and calls the police but Frank convinces him to drop the charges. An elderly man who has been blind for fifty years is taken to a new care home by his daughter. He bangs his head retrieving a remote control and when he recovers in hospital, he has regained his sight. Patrick learns his blindness was psychological, not physical, and determines to find a cause but agrees to drop it when he learns the man went blind during the Korean War: his transport was shot down and his best friend was burned so badly he didn't recognise him. A man who is due to go overseas on business is having one-night stands with women whose names begin with every letter of the alphabet before he goes, but one of them keeps calling him. While meeting with her, he collapses and Sean discovers he has Guillian Barre syndrome. He reveals the truth to the woman but she stands by him. Sean walks in on Max and Tina kissing in the staff room and ends up fighting with Max in reception, smashing his car window as he leaves. Guest starring David de Keyser, Nicola Bryant and Kay Purcell
275	21	"Full On"	Ashley Pearce	Jeff Povey	22 January 2000	9.45
Sean has spent the night in the staff room. He is visited by Tim, a friend who took the same exam as him. He later finds Tim collapsed after taking an overdose. He takes him to the department but hides the drug capsules, not wanting Tim to get into trouble for stealing them, leaving Max and Julie to work out what he's taken. He learns Tim has failed the exam four times. A man is brought in claiming he was bitten by a dog but Max and Barney realise the tooth in his leg is human. Barney later comes across a woman with his tooth embedded in her mouth. She claims he is her neighbour and was harassing her. In fact, both gave false names; they are having an affair and she got upset that he went away with his family without telling her. A man is brought in with a severe bleed and needs a transfusion. Patrick sends Chloe to get the correct blood type. Before she returns, Patrick tells Sean to give him blood a porter has brought but only just stops him when he realises it's the wrong patient and blood group. The man is eventually given the right blood. Amy goes to audition for a singing job with a band and stands up to the manager in order to get it. Tina admits to Chloe that she is torn between Max and Sean. Max tells Sean that if they can't work together one of them will have to go; Tina tells Sean she doesn't want him to go. Guest starring Tom Maguire, Bill Speed and Matthew Bowyer
276	22	"Mirror Image"	Robert Del Maestro	Sam Wheats	29 January 2000	11.99
Josh and Penny are called to a house where a teenage girl has locked herself in the bathroom and is in pain: In fact, she is in labour. Her father didn't know she is pregnant and although the baby is delivered, the girl refuses to have anything to do with her, since her parents have split up recently and she no longer believes in families. Billy, a boy who has been caught shoplifting, steals his father's car and runs over a young woman. A policeman identifies the victim as a local girl, Amanda, but when her mother Steph arrives at the hospital she realise it's her other daughter, Kirstie. She explains to Amanda that, as a single mother, she had twins and gave one up for adoption; she has been ignoring Kirstie's attempts to get in contact. Both Steph and Amanda spend time with Kirstie before she is taken to feature with a badly injured leg. Patrick treats Billy for minor injuries and tells his father to stop blaming other people for his wrongdoing. An elderly man with an injured finger comes in with a model of the Mary Rose he has built out of matchsticks. Barney accidentally breaks it and enlists Max's help to fix it before the patient notices. Tina and Sean are on the verge of a reconciliation but Tina wants to talk to Max first and decides to do it after an anti-drug lecture Frank is giving. Frank finds Crowe and Tyler harassing Angie and destroys the drugs they have with them. In revenge, they attack him and set him on fire. He is brought into hospital badly burned, and Max doesn't realise until he rings Frank's mobile and Sean answers in Resus. Guest starring Frank Middlemass, Stephanie Woodruff and Annie Taitt
277	23	"Burned Out Hearts"	Tim Leandro	Susan Boyd	5 February 2000	11.74
Patrick leads an attempt to resuscitate Frank but the burns are too severe and he sadly dies in Resus. Max talks to the police and punches one of them when, unaware Max is his father, he dismisses Frank as a drug addict whose death makes their job easier. Crowe and Tyler argue over what to do about Angie and end up getting hit by a taxi taking Amy, Chloe and Milo home from Amy's rehearsal. Max unknowingly saves Crowe's life while Tyler warns Angie not to speak to him. Max's former wife Joan arrives and they comfort each other. Charlie turfs faith healer Reg out of the hospital. Reg has two visitors: Sheila, who wants help finding her missing son, and Gloria, who wants him to contact her late husband. Gloria has an epileptic seizure: She has stopped taking her medication because she doesn't want to go on living. Sheila accompanies her to the hospital and recognises Neil, a homeless man who Holly has been treating for cirrhosis, as her son, promising to look after him. Charlie meets Leona, a frequent patient who he has been trying to get to see a psychiatrist and who has had a fall. She goes to see Reg but he drives off while she is talking to him, causing her to fall again. Charlie patches her up and she agrees to keep her psychiatric appointments. Guest starring Tony Robinson, Paul Williams and Joanna Bacon
278	24	"Tough Love"	Dominic Lees	Simon Moss	12 February 2000	12.34
Most of the staff attend Frank's funeral but are on shift afterwards, with Charlie representing them at the wake. Angie tells Max about Crowe and Tyler but is reluctant to go to the police. Charlie convinces Max to report them rather than confronting them himself. The police bring in Davy, a teenager in care who was thrown out of a TV shop. When Josh brings in Paul, a man who was knocked off his bike, Davy recognises him as a former cricket player, whose career was ended when he punched a stewardess on a flight to the West Indies. Barney speculates that he might be claustrophobic. Davy reveals he and his father used to run a fast food stand at the ground but his father was killed when a lorry drove into the van. Adam looks after Linda, a pregnant woman having an allergic reaction. Paul and Linda are both being transported in the lift when it gets stuck; Paul panics and Adam has to stop him hitting Chloe. Davy tries to climb down to help but falls and injures his ankle. The fire brigade rescue them all and Paul offers to get Davy a job at the ground. Patrick treats a young girl with a fish hook in her hand who is scared of needles; she kicks him when he tries to give her an anaesthetic injection. Holly throws him out and uses a numbing cream instead, which Patrick thinks takes too much time. Tina and Sean are continuing to see each other in secret while she supports Max. The staff attend Amy's singing debut but Max leaves early. Guest starring Nicholas Tizzard, Tim Murphy and William Scott-Masson
279	25	"Not Waving But Drowning" (Note: See also "Not Waving But Drowning" series 9 & "Waving Not Drowning" series 16)	Ashley Pearce	Andrew Rattenbury	19 February 2000	11.36
A teenage girl is brought in by her dance instructor after collapsing; her parents are dead and she is looked after by her older brother. The brother turns up and blames the teacher for pushing her too hard: She was their mother's best friend and their mother always wanted the girl to be a dancer. The girl admits she has been taking diet pills and laxatives to keep her weight down. Holly discovers she has kidney damage and may never dance again. Sean confides in Holly that he and Tina are back together and is tricked into telling Patrick that Adam is HIV positive. Penny goes on a diving course run by father and son instructors. The young woman diving with her loses her oxygen mask and surfaces too quickly, suffering an embolism. The father suffers a heart attack in the confusion and both are rushed to hospital: Patrick was about to leave for a faculty dinner but stays to lead the treatment. The son decides to defer uni and run the diving courses until his father recovers. Barney is accosted by an old friend, Ewan, who has been stabbed; he is hiding from the police so can't go to hospital. Barney tries to treat him on his own but he gets worse, only to smash the phone to stop Barney calling an ambulance. Barney runs to get Patrick, who helps get him to hospital and keeps quiet about Barney's involvement. Guest starring Una Stubbs, Paul Ireland and Burn Gorman
280	26	"Seize the Night"	Gary Love	Simon Mirren	26 February 2000	11.76
Max returns to work. Sean wants Tina to tell him about them but she refuses and Max ends up proposing to her. He is later visited by the police, who tells him they have arrested Crowe and Tyler, and Angie's statement and the forensic evidence might be enough to convict him. A woman who runs a modelling agency brings in her dog, who was bitten by a snake brought in for a shoot. Patrick thinks they should concentrate on human patients but Max insists on giving the dog antivenin. Later, the woman is brought in having been bitten herself and there is no serum left; Barney has some sent from Broadway just in time. Patrick secretly takes the dog home to look after him for the night. A gangster is unaware that his teenage daughter is seeing one of his men. She is taken to hospital with bleeding and abdominal pains and turns out to be pregnant. When he learns how the father is, the gangster has him beaten up then forces him to admit he isn't ready to be a father and break up with his daughter, before telling her he'll look after her and the baby. A girl with EPP, a hyper-sensitivity to light, is upset to hear her parents arguing about how much she should be allowed to do. She is hit by a car after running out into the road and badly burned by the lights at the hospital before managing to tell Max of her condition and give directions for treatment. Her father admits he has been made redundant and the girl explains that she feels lucky that her parents are still together. Guest starring Rhys Harris, Julia Malewski and Danny Webb
281	27	"Life Support"	Julie Edwards	Barnaby Marshall	4 March 2000	11.56
An elderly woman, Mary, comes to the hospital saying her sister Elizabeth has died. There is no record of her but then Elizabeth comes in with her husband Mark; she has suffered a stroke and is brain dead. Mary says she's always known when Elizabeth would die but Mark simply blames her for not spending enough time with her while she was alive. Mary also talks about a girl and a boy who are scared and the boy is drowning. Young teenager Gemma goes looking for her brother Jake while her mother Joanne is propping up the bar and finds him drowning in a river. He is taken to hospital where he will recover. Holly gets talking to Gemma and learns that the family are her neighbours and the baby she hears crying is the youngest sibling, Zoe. Patrick advises Holly to keep an eye on the family. A bank manager who is under pressure from his superiors to make more money has an uncomfortable encounter with a woman whose husband committed suicide because he couldn't repay his loan. He later has a heart attack; the woman visits him in hospital and he tells her he's resigning. Fed up of Tina refusing to leave Max, Sean has taken a job as a GP in Australia. He leaves at the end of the shift, only saying goodbye to Max and Adam. Tina finds out and rushes to where he is catching a train to London. He asks her to come with him and she asks him to marry her. Guest starring Peter Pacey, Mark Kingston and Cherry Morris
282	28	"Blood Brothers"	Tim Leandro	Graham Mitchell	11 March 2000	11.44
A man is brought in by his brother and mother after being stabbed and thrown through a shop window. Patrick treats him and he is taken up to theatre. A woman brings in her boyfriend, who has been in a distracted state for months and is self-harming. Patrick is condemnatory of him so Max takes over the case and realises the man has been raped. He says he confronted one of the two brothers responsible and threw him through a window. The police are called and Max tells Patrick the truth about his patient. Josh and Penny retrieve a worker who has fallen into a grain silo after having a heart attack. Without asking, his boss calls his wife and son but he has already called another woman, who he has a daughter with. It eventually transpires he is married to both women: When the truth comes out, everyone walks away from him. Gemma brings Zoe in with an ear infection to see Holly. Charlie advises Holly to call social services even though she promised Gemma she wouldn't. Joanne later turns up and warns Holly to stay out of it. Tina hands in her resignation to Charlie and tells Max she is leaving to be with Sean in Australia. Guest starring Jean Leppard, Andy Williams and Debbie Chazen
283	29	"Being There – Part One"	Robert Del Maestro (UK); Ashley Pearce (AU)	Katharine Way	18 March 2000	11.17
Tina arrives in Australia and meets Byron, whose daughter Katie, a local GP, is working with Sean. He drives her into the outback but has a blackout. Tina goes looking for help. Sean and Katie find Byron and get him to hospital but don't know Tina was with him. Tina collapses from sunstroke. Patrick looks after Martin, who has scalded himself and is in the last stages of AIDS. He is refusing to see his mother, wanting her to remember him as he was. Adam arranges a bed for him but he will need to be assessed by a medical team before being taken to a ward. A young man, Paul, is gagged and locked in a boot by his friends to test his escapology skills. His sister Jenny tells them he is a haemophiliac but by then the car has been stolen by joyriders and Paul has cut himself. The joyriders abandon him but he is later found by the police. Ray, a patient with kidney stones left on a trolley, gets aggressive with Adam but later apologises. Leona turns up at the hospital looking for Charlie but has to leave for her psychiatric appointment. Gemma learns Joanne has been fired from the supermarket and asks Holly to come round and look at Zoe. When Joanne turns up, an argument breaks out and when it spills onto the street, Joanne accidentally pushes both Holly and Gemma into the path of a car. Thousands of miles apart, both Tina and Holly lie unconscious. Guest starring Kevin Hand, Joseph Long and Sarah Smart
284	30	"Being There – Part Two"	Robert Del Maestro (UK); Ashley Pearce (AU)	Katharine Way	25 March 2000	11.72
Holly recovers and tends to Gemma as Joanne flees with Jake and Zoe. At the hospital, Holly speaks to the police and realises that her involvement is going to result in Joanne being charged and the children being taken into care. Joanne and Jake convince Holly to smuggle them in to see Gemma but Joanne is recognised and arrested. Paul is brought in and Patrick makes a point of reminding Adam he can't treat patients with open wounds. Paul is worried his friends will treat him differently but Chris still wants him to go rock climbing with them. Patrick convinces Martin to see his mother before he dies. He tells Adam his own mother wouldn't see him when she was dying and apologises for his earlier comments. Sean finds Tina unconscious and she is taken to hospital to be rehydrated. After a heart-to-heart in the outback, they ring Max and the others to tell them they're getting married. Ray is still waiting for a bed as the staff leave, having spent the entire shift in the corridor. Leona turns up again and, not wanting to talk to her, Charlie shuts himself in the toilet. Leona walks away upset, unaware Charlie has collapsed and struggling to breathe. Guest starring Kevin Hand, Joseph Long and Sarah Smart
