= Tina Seabrook =

Fictional character from the BBC medical dramas Casualty and Holby City

- Casualty character
- Claire Goose as Tina Seabrook
- First appearance: "Give My Love to Esme"; 11 September 1997
- Last appearance: "Being There – Part 2"; 25 March 2000
- Portrayed by: Claire Goose
- Spinoff(s): Holby City, 1999

In-universe information
- Occupation: Staff nurse
- Family: Jim Seabrook (father); Mary Seabrook (mother)
- Spouse: Sean Maddox
- Home: Australia

Tina Seabrook is a fictional character from the BBC medical drama Casualty, played by Claire Goose. She made her first appearance during the twelfth series episode "Give My Love to Esme", which was broadcast on 11 September 1997. Tina was introduced as a staff nurse in Holby City Hospital's emergency department. Goose was tempted to give up acting when she attended the audition for the part. It marked her first major television role. Goose spent a day at a real-life hospital while researching her character's occupation.

Tina was portrayed as being feisty, bubbly, confident, and a bit naive. A notable storyline arc for the character was her rape at the hands of a patient's husband. Producers hoped the plot would raise awareness of the dangers nurses face at work, as well as increase ratings. Goose wanted Tina to be given a love interest to show her continuing recovery from the assault, and Tina begins a relationship with senior house officer Sean Maddox (Gerald Kyd). He later has an affair with Tina's best friend Chloe Hill (Jan Anderson), which results in her pregnancy.

Goose chose to leave her role in 1999, and she made her final appearance in the fourteenth series episode "Being There – Part 2" on 25 March 2000. Tina leaves Holby to reunite with Sean in Australia. For her portrayal of Tina, Goose earned a nomination for Best Newcomer at the National Television Awards. Her introduction also led to improved ratings for the show. Goose was praised for her performance during Tina's rape storyline, but her exit was branded "nonsense" by a television critic.

== Storylines ==
Tina replaces Jude Kocarnik (Lisa Coleman) as a staff nurse in the emergency department (ED) at Holby City Hospital. She befriends fellow nurse Sam Colloby (Jonathan Kerrigan) and porter Sunny (Vincenzo Pellegrino), who develops a crush on her. Receptionist Amy Howard (Rebecca Wheatley) arranges a blind date for Sunny and Tina, but she does not tell them who they are meeting. While Tina treats Edmund White (Richard Hope), a patient brought in with his wife June (Elizabeth Berrington), who has suffered a fall, he talks to Tina about his marriage problems. Eve Montgomery (Barbara Marten) reprimands Tina for getting too involved and Tina advises Edmund to speak to a counsellor. As Tina is leaving the hospital at the end of her shift, Edmund tells her he will not be able to cope with June's paralysis. Tina replies that he should go and speak with the charge nurse, which angers Edmund. He then drags Tina into the toilets and rapes her. When Tina returns to work, Sam notices bruises on her wrist and she tells him she was robbed.

Tina struggles to treat Sunny's sister Karen (Angela Lonsdale), after she is beaten by her boyfriend. Tina takes Karen to the toilets, but panics and leaves her there. Eve questions Tina about her behaviour and Tina eventually tells her she was raped. The rest of the staff find out and Eve takes her home. Tina decides to press charges against Edmund, but Eve learns the security cameras were not working, so there is little evidence. Tina moves in with Sam and Sunny, and later with new nurse Chloe (Jan Anderson). During their house warming party, Tina meets Sean Maddox (Gerald Kyd). She supports him when he is sued for negligence and they begin dating. Tina briefly breaks up with Sean, thinking they want different things, but they reconcile and Tina agrees to move in with him. However, Tina later learns Sean and Chloe had an affair, and Chloe is pregnant. Tina and Sunny visit Sam in Cornwell, where he is recovering from injuries sustained in a fall. They convince him to come back to Holby, but they are involved in a bus crash on the way. Tina accepts Sam's decision to leave the hospital.

Duffy (Cathy Shipton) informs Tina that Chloe is having an abortion, and Tina offers to drive Chloe to the hospital. Tina also begins talking to Sean again. She takes part in a charity parachute jump with consultant Max Gallagher (Robert Gwilym). They kiss and begin a relationship, but have trouble telling Sean. He later walks in on them kissing and the men fight. Tina realises she still has feelings for Sean, but struggles to tell Max because he is grieving for his son, so she dates them both. Tina learns Sean is leaving for Australia and she races to the train station, where she finds Sean and asks him to marry her. Tina decides to leave Holby to be with Sean. She flies to Alice Springs and meets Byron (John Gibson), who tells her Sean is working with his daughter Katie (Maya Stange). On the way to meet him, Byron blacks out and crashes the car. Tina goes in search of help and collapses due to dehydration. Sean and Katie find Byron and later Tina. Sean proposes and Tina accepts. She calls the hospital and apologises to Max, who tells the staff Sean and Tina are getting married.

== Casting ==
Actress Claire Goose attended an audition for the role of Tina at a time when she was tempted to give up acting. She remarked to the casting director that she seemed to get down to the last two for the parts she auditioned for, but was never successful. The casting director told her things would soon change and she was later offered the role of Tina. Tina marked her first major television role. Goose admitted that she had wanted to appear in Casualty since she was a young girl. Her father was a doctor, so she felt comfortable with the medical terms and was able to ask him for help when she needed something explained to her. Goose's father also arranged for her to spend the day at a hospital in King's Lynn, so she could research her character's occupation. Producers were impressed with Goose's performance and asked her to return for the following series.

== Development ==
=== Characterisation ===
Tina was a feisty young nurse, often pulled up by her superiors for her blunt tone and for forgetting how much she still had to learn. Tina's confident attitude was undermined when she was raped by a patient's husband. Her recovery was slow and difficult, but helped by the arrival of fellow junior nurse, Chloe, who brought optimism and fun back to Tina's life.

— An excerpt from Tina's profile on the official Casualty website.

Tina was initially billed as "over-keen" and clumsy, but "a promising member of staff". Of her role within the emergency department, Goose said "Although she's the lowest grade of nurse, she tends to make decisions herself rather than ask those above her. She keeps on getting into trouble with those above, her. But she isn't jaded or cynical so I hope the viewers will take to her." Tina did not receive any support from her parents, making her "determined and headstrong". Goose shared some similarities with her character, as they were both independent and enthusiastic. The actress continued, "she's young and a bit naive but still speaks her mind and is very determined. I'm like that."

Goose did not think Tina's uniform was sexy or flattering, describing it as "functional and comfy". The uniforms were later updated and changed to green scrubs, which Goose said was "far more comfortable and practical". She also thought the nurses looked more efficient. During her tenure, Tina's personality changed and she became more resilient and confident. Goose stated that Tina "bounces back from whatever's thrown at her", making her more fun to play.

=== Rape ===
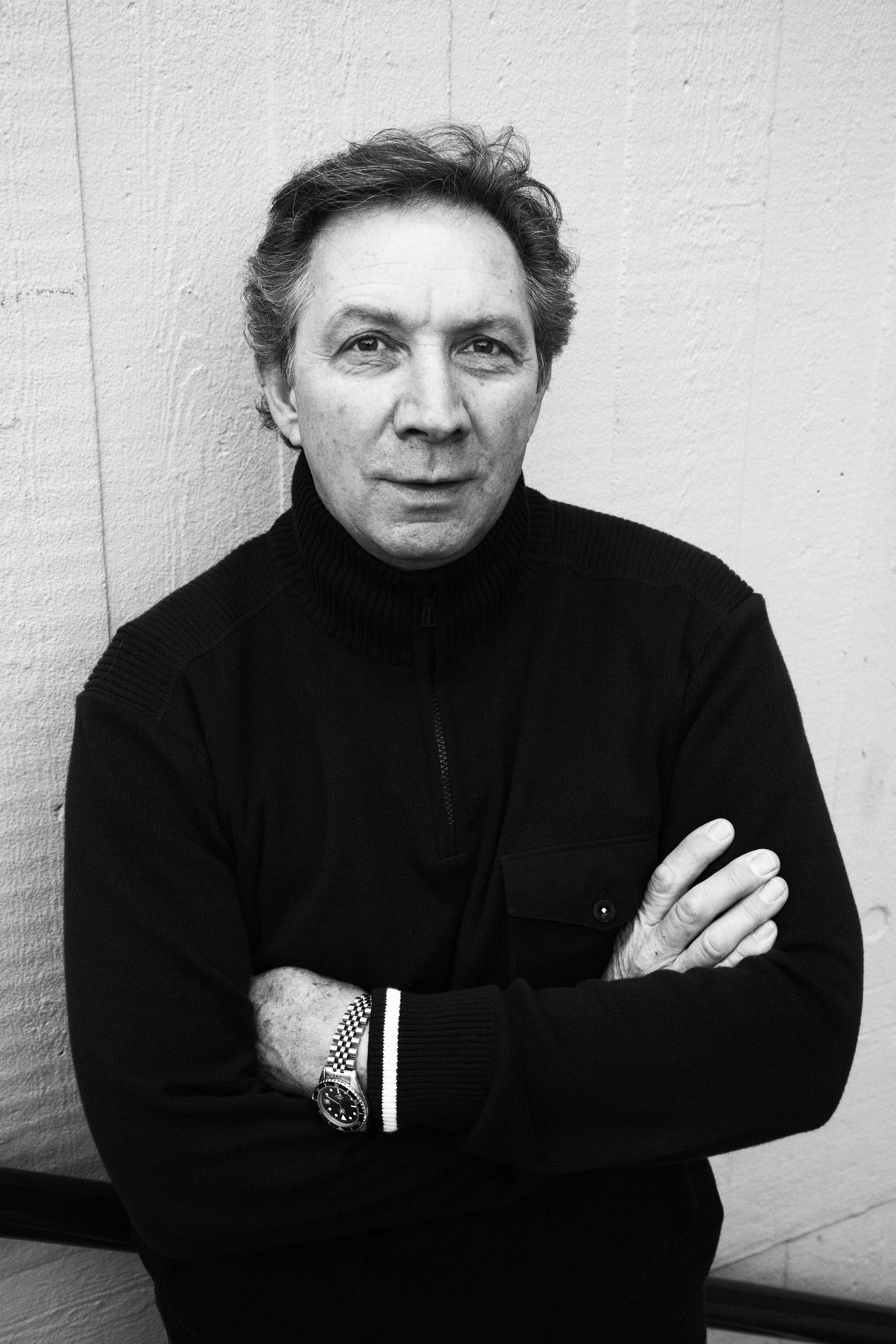
Tina was raped in the hospital by Edmund White, played by Richard Hope (pictured).

Towards the end of series 12, Tina's first major storyline arc began as she was raped by a patient's husband. When the producers informed Goose she was getting the dramatic storyline, she was not "daunted" and instead used the opportunity to show her skills as an actress. Goose immediately undertook research for the storyline, before the writers had a chance to script it. She spent a total of six months researching the topic. She also spoke with rape counsellors ahead of filming, which lasted for a month. Producers hoped the four-part storyline would increase ratings and raise awareness of the dangers nurses face at work from similar attacks. The storyline also dealt with the issue of government cuts, as the "cash-strapped" hospital's CCTV fails to capture Tina's assault.

Tina is dragged into the hospital toilets and raped by Edmund White (Richard Hope). Goose called him "a particularly nasty" type of rapist, as he also uses emotional violence and threats to terrorise her. The actress said, "It's a revenge thing. They seem like regular, nice kind of people. You wouldn't expect them to be like that." Following the assault, Tina goes into denial and initially tells her colleagues that she has been robbed. Goose explained that Tina tries to cope with her ordeal alone, as she feels that she had "let everyone down". She also feels that she has lost control and does not want her friends to attempt to put her "back together again". Gavin Docherty of the Sunday Mail observed that Tina's behaviour was typical, as many women were worried that the police and court procedures after reporting an assault would be degrading.

Goose admitted she struggled to "switch off" after a day filming the storyline, saying "I was never out of it. I was a lot more introverted and felt quite withdrawn." After the storyline aired, she received letters from real-life rape victims and she replied to them all offering her support. Tina eventually tells fellow nurse Eve Montgomery (Barbara Marten) about her ordeal. Goose hoped Tina would be able to get over her assault and emerge stronger. During the following series, Tina was shown to be rebuilding her life and becoming her bubbly self once more.

=== Relationships ===
As the rape storyline concluded, Goose teased a potential romance for her character. The actress had suggested Tina was given a love interest, as she wanted to show that it is part of recovering from an assault. Tina later begins a relationship with senior house officer Sean Maddox (Gerald Kyd). He is the first person she has sex with following her rape. A love triangle develops when Sean has an affair with Tina's best friend Chloe Hill (Jan Anderson). At the end of the thirteenth series, Tina discovers Sean has gotten Chloe pregnant. Goose told Wendy Granditer of Inside Soap that Tina feels "totally betrayed" by Sean and Chloe, but instead of getting upset, she begins acting aggressively towards the pair. Goose was pleased with the changes to Tina's personality during the storyline, saying "When she first started in the show she was bubbly, but that was all. Now I get the chance to show another side to her, the bitchy side that comes out when she finds out about Sean and Chloe." The actress admitted that when she played Tina's new "no-nonsense" side, she got a bit bored shouting all the time, so she asked the directors if she could change things to avoid the audience growing tired of Tina behaviour.

Tina rejects both Chloe and Sean in the wake of her discovery. While Sean fights for his relationship with Tina, Chloe struggles with whether to keep the baby or not. Tina also has to cope with the situation on her own, as her confidant and fellow nurse Sam Colloby (Jonathan Kerrigan) fights for his life, after being pushed over a balcony. Tina later visits Sam in Cornwall, where he is recovering, and learns that he does not want to return to the hospital. Tina misses having Sam around to talk to, and Goose commented, "It's like her whole world is falling apart." The actress was pleased to be a part of the long-running storyline. She admitted that she was unsure how she would react if she was in a similar situation as Tina, but thought she would regain her confidence and continue on. When Tina learns that Chloe is having an abortion, she supports her through it and they reconnect.

Tina later dates consultant Max Gallagher (Robert Gwilym), despite still having feelings for Sean. The relationship begins shortly after Max has a "fling" with Duffy (Cathy Shipton). Gwilym admitted to being "bemused" by his character's sudden romances after 18 months. He said Max and Tina's relationship was "different, a much slower burn" than the one Max had with Duffy. He explained "It's a friendship to begin with and there are doubts about it, especially on his side." Both Ceri Gould of the Wales on Sunday and Gwilym acknowledged that Tina is half Max's age. Gwilym told Gould that Max only starts talking to Tina because Sean asks for his help in repairing his relationship with her. When Tina tells Max that she wishes Sean was more like him, he begins to think about a romantic connection. Gwilym continued: "He can't believe that someone like Tina would be interested in him, so he doesn't quite know if he's reading the signals correctly." The show's Christmas episodes see the pair getting closer when they take part in a charity parachute jump, and they later kiss when they get stuck in a lift together.

=== Departure ===
In December 1999, Goose announced her intentions to leave the show the following year. Her decision to leave was influenced by the arrival of younger cast members, and the departures of her co-stars and friends Rebecca Lacey and Jonathan Kerrigan. She commented, "I've been left alone. It's a different dynamic now, but it's still fun. I seem to always be in male company these days and I'm desperate for a girly night out." Tina departure storyline was "unusual", as it was filmed in Australia. During the shoot, Goose feared being bitten by a scorpion or venomous snake.

After learning from Max that Sean was leaving Holby, Tina realises that she loves him and proposes to him as his train leaves the station. She then decides to follow Sean to Australia, but she is unsure of his location. Tina soon becomes stranded in the outback and falls unconscious from dehydration. Sean rescues her and they later call the hospital to inform everyone that they are getting married. Maddox reprised his role in 2006. Sean was "bitter" upon his return, as he and Tina had separated and he rarely saw their child.

== Reception ==
For her portrayal of Tina, Goose received a nomination for Best Newcomer at the 4th National Television Awards in 1998. Her introduction led to improved ratings for the show, particularly among the younger male viewers; Jane Oddy of the Daily Mirror observed Tina had "injected much-needed glamour into Holby City Hospital's accident and emergency room." She also called her a "quirky, idealistic staff nurse". Oddy's colleague Thomas Quinn branded her a "demure yet troubled nurse". Kathleen Morgan of the Daily Record said Goose gave a "powerful performance" during Tina's rape storyline, which "produced some of the medical drama's most moving scenes to date". The Sunday Mail's Gavin Docherty called the storyline "the most harrowing the series has ever tackled". He also dubbed Tina "the caring face of Holby General." John Russell of The Sunday People branded Tina a "sex-crazed nurse".

When she and Sean left for Australian, Russell quipped "who can blame them?" He also called the Australia storyline "nonsense", and stated "Birdbrain of the week was scrumptious Tina who turned up in Australia panting for Sean in last night's Casualty and ended up lost in the Outback as dinner for a dingo." Rick Fulton of the Daily Record found the conclusion to the storyline "a bit of an anti-climax", and pointed out that Tina was "up and looking like a million dollars" shortly after Sean found her. Fulton's colleague Jan Patience observed Goose "captured the hearts of millions" as Tina. Fifteen years after her departure from the show, Goose was still being recognised as Tina, which she thought was "extraordinary". The Daily Mirror's Emma Chadwick included Goose in her 2016 feature about "the pin-ups" of Casualty. She also dubbed Tina a "sexy nurse".
