= Casualty series 12 =

Twelfth series of Casualty

Casualty
- Series 12
- Starring: Donna Alexander; Peter Birch; Ian Bleasdale; Sorcha Cusack; Sue Devaney; Claire Goose; Peter Guinness; Paterson Joseph; Jonathan Kerrigan; Rebecca Lacey; Barbara Marten; Gray O'Brien; Vincenzo Pellegrino; Derek Thompson; Julia Watson; Rebecca Wheatley
- No. of episodes: 26

Release
- Original network: BBC One
- Original release: 11 September 1997 – 28 February 1998

Series chronology
- ← Previous; Series 11 Next → Series 13

The twelfth series of the British medical drama television series Casualty commenced airing in the United Kingdom on BBC One on 11 September 1997 and finished on 28 February 1998.

== Production ==
Sally Haynes took over from Ros Anderson as producer for this series.

This series was notable as episodes 1 and 17 had an extended 'feature-length' running time of 75 minutes, compared to the standard episode length of 50 minutes.

"Give My Love To Esme" (episode 1), featured a dramatic storyline involving a car bomb exploding in a shopping centre car park. It was initially scheduled to air on the evening of Saturday 6 September. However, following the broadcast of the Funeral of Diana, Princess of Wales earlier that day, the BBC postponed the episode until the following Thursday, deeming it unsuitable to show such content so soon after the national tragedy.

"The Golden Hour" (episode 17), featured a huge motorway pile-up, involving multiple vehicles and a fuel tanker. Filming took place at RAF Wroughton in Wiltshire, where set designers spent five weeks constructing two three-lane carriageways, with filming scheduled across six nights. The episodes that followed highlighted the traumatic effects of the accident on General Manager Eliot Matthews, who starts to suffer with post-traumatic stress.

A significant storyline started in "Degrees of Separation" (episode 20), in which nurse Tina Seabrook was sexually assaulted. When the producers informed Goose she was getting the dramatic storyline, she was not "daunted" and instead used the opportunity to show her skills as an actress. Goose immediately undertook research for the storyline, before the writers had a chance to script it and spent a total of six months researching the topic. Producers hoped the four-part storyline would increase ratings and raise awareness of the dangers nurses face at work from similar attacks. The storyline also dealt with the issue of government cuts, as the hospital's CCTV fails to capture Tina's assault.

The series also featured the first official two-part story, "Everlasting Love", which played out over episodes 25 and 26, seeing the temporary return of characters Ash, Duffy, Megan and Mike Barratt. Filming for Charlie and Baz's wedding took place aboard a pleasure cruiser moored at Southampton Docks. The cast released a cover version of "Everlasting Love" as featured in the episode as a Children in Need charity single in 1998, with lead vocals performed by actress Rebecca Wheatley. The single reached no. 5 in the UK singles chart.

== Cast ==
=== Overview ===
The twelfth series of Casualty features a cast of characters working in the emergency department of Holby City Hospital. The series began with 8 roles with star billing, with a number of cast changes following the departures of several characters at the end of the previous series. Peter Birch and Julia Watson starred as emergency medicine consultants Jack Hathaway and Barbara "Baz" Hayes. Gray O'Brien appeared as senior house officer Richard McCaig. Derek Thompson continued his role as charge nurse Charlie Fairhead while Sorcha Cusack portrayed sister Kate Wilson. Jonathan Kerrigan appeared as staff nurse Sam Colloby. Ian Bleasdale and Sue Devaney starred as paramedics Josh Griffiths and Liz Harker. Soo Drouet continued her recurring role as Monica, an anaesthetist, until episode three.

The series' opening episode saw the introduction of six new characters: general manager Elliot Matthews (Peter Guinness); senior house officer Georgina "George" Woodman (Rebecca Lacey); senior staff nurse Mark Grace (Paterson Joseph); staff nurse Tina Seabrook (Claire Goose); receptionist Amy Howard (Rebecca Wheatley); and porter Derek "Sunny" Sunderland (Vincenzo Pellegrino). Barbara Marten also joined the cast in episode thirteen as senior staff nurse (later, sister) Eve Montgomery. Donna Alexander returned to the cast as paramedic Penny Hutchens, now a regular cast member following guest appearances in the previous series. Patrick Robinson, Brenda Fricker, Cathy Shipton and Clive Mantle reprised their roles as Martin "Ash" Ashford, Megan Roach, Lisa "Duffy" Duffin and Mike Barratt for the two-part season finale which saw Charlie and Baz marry. Six cast members departed throughout this series: Cusack, Birch and Devaney departed in episodes ten, eleven and twelve respectively; and Watson, O'Brien and Guinness left at the conclusion of the series.

=== Main characters ===
- Donna Alexander as Penny Hutchens (from episode 1)
- Peter Birch as Jack Hathaway (until episode 11)
- Ian Bleasdale as Josh Griffiths
- Sorcha Cusack as Kate Wilson (until episode 10)
- Sue Devaney as Liz Harker (until episode 12)
- Claire Goose as Tina Seabrook (from episode 1)
- Peter Guinness as Elliot Matthews (episodes 1−26)
- Paterson Joseph as Mark Grace (from episode 1)
- Jonathan Kerrigan as Sam Colloby
- Rebecca Lacey as Georgina "George" Woodman (from episode 1)
- Barbara Marten as Eve Montgomery (from episode 13)
- Gray O'Brien as Richard McCaig (until episode 26)
- Vincenzo Pellegrino as Derek "Sunny" Sunderland (from episode 1)
- Derek Thompson as Charlie Fairhead
- Julia Watson as Barbara "Baz" Hayes (until episode 26)
- Rebecca Wheatley as Amy Howard (from episode 1)

=== Recurring and guest characters ===
- Soo Drouet as Monica (until episode 3)
- Brenda Fricker as Megan Roach (episodes 25−26)
- Clive Mantle as Mike Barratt (episodes 25−26)
- Joseph May as Paul (episodes 3−17)
- Tim Perrin as Keith Merrick (episodes 21−26)
- Patrick Robinson as Martin "Ash" Ashford (episodes 25−26)
- Cathy Shipton as Lisa "Duffy" Duffin (episodes 25−26)

== Episodes ==
No. overall	No. in series	Title	Directed by	Written by	Original release date	UK viewers (millions)
201	1	"Give My Love to Esme"	Peter Barber-Fleming	Ginnie Hole	11 September 1997	20.65
The staff receive news Matt and Jude have married. Jack is now engaged to Jayne but overreacts when new nurse Tina Seabrook makes an unfortunate comment about a man who deliberately fell off a ladder to get into hospital, having been told he would have to wait years for an appointment for his arthritis. Josh and Liz try to get Ian and Esme, a couple who are having a baby to the hospital, but end up having to deliver the baby in the back of an ambulance. Ian goes to see his parents but is offended by his mother, who feels the fact he and Esme are unmarried reflects badly on his father, a vicar. Young black couple Jason and Lou are arguing about her desire to join the police, who Jason sees as institutionally racist. After they part ways, Jason sees someone park a van in the car park at a shopping centre. A bomb in the van goes off, causing many casualties. Charlie worries about Baz, who was shopping on her day off, and is relieved when Penny tells him she was at the scene helping with the wounded. An elderly man removes glass imbedded in his wife's stomach and she dies of internal bleeding. Lou seems to have minor injuries but in hospital a scan shows she has a bleed on the brain, which leaves her in a coma; Jason tells the police what he saw. Ian has been left trapped in rubble and when a second bomb is discovered Baz and Josh amputate his foot to get him out. Extended episode, lasting 75 minutes. Due to broadcast on 6 September 1997, although was postponed following the death of Diana, Princess of Wales. Note: Font & Title Sequence (Black & Turquoise) changed
202	2	"Private Lives"	Peter Barber-Fleming	Robin Mukherjee	13 September 1997	20.32
An underage prostitute, Lucy, is lured to a garage by a client where she is beaten up by a group of men and dumped outside the hospital. Jack warns George about getting too involved in the case. Lucy's friend Julie turns up and it transpires she set up the beating because Lucy was planning on quitting the game. Lucy initially leaves with Julie but later returns to see George. Liz argues with her husband John, who thinks she is not spending enough time at home. A young woman brings in her older neighbour; they are involved in a dispute over a fence and the older woman tripped over. Sam manages to get them talking. A young man with a history of mental health issues pushes his mother (Brigit Forsyth) down the stairs. Richard and Kate convince her to have him sent to a psychiatric hospital.
203	3	"Nearest and Dearest"	Martin Hutchings	Stephen Wyatt	20 September 1997	17.93
A man is attempting to leave his wife but she throws herself through a glass door to stop him. He takes her to hospital but is shot in reception by a man wearing a motorcycle helmet and dies in Crash. Tina, who was standing next to him at the time, hides in the toilets but manages to rally herself and finish her shift, while Elliot faces calls for more security. The wife's brother tells her they were dealing drugs in order to finance her lifestyle and were threatened by rivals, which is why they were trying to leave; she decides to tell the police everything. A first aider who has had an accident himself criticises the staff's techniques but becomes humbler on learning he has been voted out of his position. A teenage boy is brought in after drinking heavily with his friends. His mother is dismissive, saying he is an alcoholic like his father, who died recently. Kate manages to get the pair talking, but arrives home too late to see Nick and his friends.
204	4	"What Friends Are For"	Hettie MacDonald	Andrew Holden	27 September 1997	—
A man returns home and tells his wife (Emily Joyce) that he is going away on business and wants her and their baby son to go and stay with his mother. When she tries to run off with the baby, he slams her arm in a car door and she assaults him with a crook lock. The husband is initially ostracised by the hospital staff until they discover his wife, who has post-natal depression, has been attacking him for months. Baz tries to get them talking but instead, he disappears with their son. Richard treats a boy involved in gang violence with a slashed cheek, who refuses to see a plastic surgeon. Richard is happy to stitch it himself until George shows the boy the extent of his injury. Hazel, a single mother, asks her friend Michelle to look after her son Ben: They are both recovering drug addicts. Ben is knocked over by a bike while Michelle is buying drugs. Poor communication between Richard and George means there is a delay in finding out he has kidney damage but he is eventually saved. Jack leaves abruptly after getting a phone call. Sam's boyfriend Paul turns up wanting to borrow money. Liz tells John one of them has to move out. Kate worries when Nick needs money for a school trip. George agrees to go back to Mark's place for a meal.
205	5	"The Things We Do For Love"	Michael Owen Morris	Peter Bowker	4 October 1997	—
Kate runs up a large bill at a department store. A teenage girl with cerebral palsy has a seizure while using the computer and is found by her friends. Her boyfriend gives Jack some pills she dropped earlier: She has epilepsy and stopped taking her medication. Jack yells at her for wasting their time and it is left to Kate to help her see she can still lead a normal life. A middle-aged girl goes to see her husband in a care home with her son but blasts her daughter, who she blames for his business failing after she set up in competition. The son rams his sister's car, causing a motorway pile-up. He later realises the business was failing anyway and she was helping out, but the mother dies before she can accept this. Liz is staying with Josh after walking out on John and tells him John had an affair. Elliot chooses to spend extra money on redecorating instead of security. Richards asks George out but she turns him down. She tells Mark to forget their night together, then confuses things further by kissing him.
206	6	"Counting the Cost"	Nigel Douglas	Tony McHale	11 October 1997	19.00
A 13-year-old boy from a large family is working illegally at a factory. He falls onto a spike and later collapses in the street. Mark and Tina realise his mother knew what was going on. Tina calls Social Services but later regrets it when she learns the mother has struggled to find work and the family have been split up in the past. An elderly woman brings in her wheelchair-using husband; George and Sam realise he has been dead for hours. The woman has trouble accepting it when Kate tells her, and Sam has to help her come to terms with the news. An ice hockey captain (Ramon Tikaram) gets into a fight with one of his team during a match, and the fight spills over at the hospital. He announces he is retiring to become a coach and refuses to consider his rival as captain. Baz and George are annoyed when Jack covers for Richard, who is seeing his MS counsellor. Jack contacts another doctor to try to get confidential information.
207	7	"Always on My Mind"	Anthony Garner	Shelagh Stephenson	18 October 1997	16.89
Jack shows little interest in a homeless boy and wants to discharge him, even though Tina is worried about his cough. He is later found hiding in a cupboard and Charlie gets Richard to examine him; he is sent to the ward. A middle-aged man (George Costigan) is at a rave with a teenage girl. He takes a tablet she gave him but later collapses. At the hospital, it is revealed they are father and daughter: He walked out on her when she was young and has been trying to get to know her. She gave him ketamine to pay him back; Tina gets them talking. Elderly sisters Phylidda and Hannah are ballroom dancing when Hannah has a heart attack. Jack refuses to resuscitate her, insisting she has no chance of survival, and Charlie tells Phylidda she is dead. However, when Kate and Mark check on her some time later, they find she still has a pulse, and Phylidda walks in on an unsuccessful resuscitation attempt. Jack sidesteps the blame, telling Phylidda it was a mistake by the nursing staff.
208	8	"Finders Keepers"	Martin Hutchings	Joe Broughton	25 October 1997	17.06
A tutor is in a relationship with an ex-student. When they catch a young man breaking into their home, he chases after him and accidentally runs him over. The young man turns out to be another ex-student that he had a relationship with. The tutor's girlfriend walks out on him and Sam convinces the young man to let go of his obsession. A pregnant Asian woman is horrified when her husband (Ian Aspinall) moves his mother back into the house to look after her while he is away, since she bullied her when she lived with them before. When she sees the couple having a bonfire, the mother-in-law believes they are burning her things and pushes the daughter-in-law onto the fire, badly burning her. The husband witnesses the bullying first hand at the hospital but Baz convinces the woman to apologise to the couple. Elliot asks Charlie for a statement on Hannah's death, since Phylidda has made a complaint, and Charlie begins to realise Jack lied about what happened. Kate is arrested for shoplifting.
209	9	"Whatever it Takes"	Hettie MacDonald	Tony Lindsay	1 November 1997	15.99
Kate has been charged but has kept it from her family and co-workers. A teenage girl is out with her daughter when he is snatched by an older woman, after which she falls down an embankment. The other woman is forced to accompany them to the hospital where she tells Jack the girl had the girl as a surrogate for her and her husband then refused to hand her over. Jack blasts her and tells Charlie, who has just found out from Elliot that their statements conflict, that Jayne has walked out on him despite being pregnant. The girl reveals she was already pregnant when the couple approached her and the would-be mother is forced to accept she has no claim on the girl. A man turns up with a cut head after his wife hit him with an iron; he tried to take a coupon worth £500 off her, afraid she would waste it. He eventually suggests they spend the night in a posh hotel. Engaged couple Tom and Helen (Caroline Harker) have gone to the funfair with Tom's mentally disabled brother Peter. Peter sustains a minor injury falling off a roundabout and they try to take him to hospital. Tom is distracted and crashes into a parked car. Josh and Liz are driving past on another shout and Liz insists on being dropped off and staying with the casualties until Penny arrives with back-up. Tom dies of his injuries and Peter is left blinded by glass in his eyes. Helen is left with the prospect of caring for him alone indefinitely and tells Liz she should have left them.
210	10	"A Taste of Freedom"	Nigel Douglas	Shelagh Stephenson	8 November 1997	17.22
Kate's arrest makes the papers and she tells the rest of the staff that it's true. Elliot offers her counselling but she refuses and tells Charlie that she stole things for the thrill. A woman obsessed with healthy eating and exercise alienates her husband (Tim Bentinck) and daughter before collapsing and vomiting. It turns out she has an aneurysm. Richard convinces her to have surgery and her husband tells her when she gets out of hospital things will have to change. A caterer (John McArdle) is looking after his elderly wheelchair-using father (Geoffrey Bayldon), who is trying to ruin his relationship with a market gardener (Charlie Hardwick). While the girlfriend is in the house, the father deliberately tips himself out of his wheelchair and blames her. Kate sees him get out of his wheelchair and tells the son, and the couple walk-out on him. Afterwards, the father arrests. As both Baz and Jack throw a birthday surprise for Charlie, Kate tells him she's leaving immediately and walks out of the hospital. Kate Wilson departs
211	11	"Bad Company"	Michael Owen Morris	Robin Mukherjee	15 November 1997	—
A teenage boy goes to a hostel looking for a young woman, but she insists she doesn't know him. A friend of hers convinces her they should drive the boy to the station, but an argument results in the boy taking control of the car and crashing it on the motorway. The friend is killed and the woman admits the boy is her younger brother, who was taken into care when their father died. A vicar turns away a beggar, unaware he is a friend of his estranged daughter, who he hasn't seen since an argument eight years previous. During an altercation, the daughter is accidentally stabbed. Her mother tracked her down in secret and has been in contact with her; she has been married and has a son. The daughter dies from an undiagnosed head injury shortly after reconciling with her father, and her parents agree to look after her son. A clown, Tony, is brought in after a minor fall but suffers bleeding from a gastric ulcer, with Jack haranguing the Resus team. He tells his friend Claud that he has got a job at a circus and wants to dissolve their partnership, believing no-one wants clowns for children's parties anymore. Sam convinces Claud he can manage without Tony. Liz tells Josh she has resigned. Elliot tells Jack he has been accused of falsifying reports and damaging morale. Jack blames Charlie but Baz tells him she made the complaint. At the end of the shift, Jack tells the staff he is resigning, effective immediately, intending to track down Jayne and their child. He advises Richard to be honest about his condition.
212	12	"Moving On"	Alan Wareing	Jonathan Rich	22 November 1997	18.15
A woman and her young son try to leave her volatile husband but he catches them in the act and attacks her. The son calls an ambulance but when Josh and Liz turn up he takes them all hostage with a knife and later traps them in a lift, but flees when Josh calls the police. He later turns up at the hospital and threatens her again but Liz talks him round and he is arrested. Liz ducks out of her farewell party but later returns to say a private farewell to Josh. An elderly woman who had an asthma attack makes up stories about a son to cover up her empty life. She gets chatting to the man in the next bed, who later has a stroke and is found dead in the toilet, inspiring her to live her life. Elliot tries to get Baz to postpone her holiday since Jack is no longer around to cover but she refuses. Charlie explains his reasons for supporting Jack but Baz is upset he didn't trust her and tells him she doesn't want him coming on the holiday. At the end of the shift, Charlie returns home to find Baz and Louis have left without him.
213	13	"Power of Persuasion"	Anthony Garner	Tony Lindsay	29 November 1997	—
Senior Staff Nurse Eve Montgomery arrives to run the department as holiday cover for Charlie. She has to deal with a number of calamities, including a budgerigar getting loose. The bird was brought in by an elderly woman who Richard discovers has contracted psittacosis from her aviary; Tina convinces her to get herself and the birds treated. A pregnant woman tries to keep the peace between her husband and daughter then suffers cramps and has a miscarriage. The husband treats the daughter badly; she is not his and since he and his wife have been together they have had five miscarriages. The wife wants to stop trying but is afraid he will leave her; he eventually agrees what they have is enough. A young runner is being trained by his older brother but collapses breathless. Penny realises he is hypo but he is not diabetic. Hypodermics are found in his bag and his brother assumes he is taking drugs again. In fact, feeling pressured by the fact his brother gave up a running career to look after him, he is taking insulin to improve his performance. Sunny finds him collapsed in the toilet after taking another injection; the tension between Richard and George nearly derails his treatment but Eve smooths things over. The brother reveals he was never good enough to be a star and the youngster decides to give up running. At the end of the shift, Elliot suggests Eve apply for the vacant sister's post, horrifying Mark and Sam who have clashed with her throughout the day.
214	14	"Out of Control"	Gary Love	Carolyn Sally Jones	6 December 1997	—
A teacher (John Forgeham) has a run-in with a boy he excluded for attacking another pupil with a baseball bat. The boy smashes up a science lab and injures himself on a bunsen burner. His father is more interested in blaming the teacher than supporting his son. The teacher tells Mark he blames himself for failing to have an effect on the father when he was at school. Mark gets him to speak to the boy and convinces him he has made a difference, but he is later brought in badly beaten up. Josh is having trouble adjusting to working with Penny. An engaged couple get into a row when he fails to turn up to the inoculations he needs for their honeymoon and she ends up pushing him down an embankment. Richard criticises her for her lack of sympathy; the man has a phobia of needles but overcomes it when he is given anaesthetic. Ageing doctor Archie Whitlow (T. P. McKenna) arrives as a locum consultant but thinks a man with pancreatitis has indigestion; Eve orders the necessary tests. He then forgets how to put a chest tube in a patient; Mark does it for him. Tina tells Eve, who reports the incident to Elliot without mentioning Mark's breach of protocol; he agrees not to use Archie again. Mark tells George he was once a medical student but started an operation without a qualified doctor present and perforated the patient's bowel.
215	15	"Love's Labour"	Joanna Hogg	Gil Brailey	13 December 1997	—
Charlie and Baz return from their unsuccessful holiday; Charlie left after the first week. Eve tells Charlie about Mark's actions; Charlie informally reprimands him but does nothing official. A man with a busted foot reveals he kicked a wall when he found out his brother is gay. When he learns Sam is gay as well, he refuses to let him treat him, but Charlie and Eve order them to continue and Sam convinces the man his brother still needs him. A pub landlord throws out some troublemakers but they later return and hit him in the face with a snooker cue. At the hospital, it is discovered he has lost an eye. His mother (Rachel Davies) admits she has been dealing drugs and owes the men money; he wants nothing more to do with her. A woman is brought in from prison after cutting her arm with glass; she was jailed for sex with a minor after sleeping with a boy half her age. She turns out to be heavily pregnant and the baby is delivered as an emergency, but a blood clot from an ankle injury causes a fatal pulmonary embolism. Her young boyfriend is unable to cope with the news and walks away from his child.
216	16	"Facing Up" (Note: See also "Facing Up" series 6, "Facing Up" series 19 & "Face Up" series 23)	Michael Owen Morris	Jonathan Rich	20 December 1997	—
It is the day of the interviews for the CN post and Sam and Sunny, wanting Mark to get the job, sabotage the external candidates by telling them that Elliot, who has a cold, will sneeze if he dislikes them. Charlie and Baz are both on the panel, but with things frosty between them, Charlie spends his break with personnel officer Zoe Garrard. Mark messes up his interview when a question about a colleague causing a patient's death causes him to believe they know about his experience in medical school. A store Santa comes in with back pains. Richard wants to keep him in when he has blood in his urine but Tina learns he put it there himself since the store is about to replace him. Richard throws him out but Eve gets him a job as Santa on a children's ward. Brian and his teenage son Liam are moving in with his fiancé Roz (Kim Hartman). Liam goes into the garage to see his pet rat but accidentally starts a fire by spilling petrol and paint on a fan heater and is trapped inside. Brian tries to rescue him but is overcome by fumes. Josh and Penny rescue Liam by driving the ambulance into the garage but Brian dies of smoke inhalation. Roz blames Liam and refuses to have anything to do with him. Josh visits Liam in the hospital, having become attached to him. At the staff Christmas party, Elliot announces Eve has the job. Mark and George share a kiss.
217	17	"The Golden Hour"	Nigel Douglas	Barbara Machin	27 December 1997	21.20
A teenage girl, Rose, is brought in with apparent alcohol poisoning but turns out to be faking it. Tina learns she doesn't get along with her mother Annie's new boyfriend Frank. Annie is convinced to go home but falls asleep while driving on the motorway and causes a pile-up. Elliot has been shadowing Josh and Penny and accompanies them to the scene; George, Mark and Sam are also dispatched. Among the casualties is a teenage couple who have been dating in secret, and whose parents are also seeing each other. The girl's mother eventually agrees to them continuing to see each other provided they don't sleep together again until she is sixteen, but abandons plans for them all to move in together. Annie turns out to have been taking slimming pills that cause drowsiness and breaks up with Frank on learning he tried to force Rose to move out. Rescue attempts at the pile-up are further complicated when a tanker crashes next to the scene – and then worsened when a delivery driver, out on a run following an argument with his girlfriend, crashes into the tanker which sparks a fire. He rescues a woman who was trapped in her car but catches fire himself in the process, which is witnessed by a horrified Elliot. He is eventually found badly burned and dies in hospital. Sam finds Paul kissing the woman he rescued and learns he has been cheating on him; Eve comforts him and reassesses her opinion of him. Baz tells Charlie she is moving in with her mother. Extended episode running to 75 minutes.
218	18	"An Eye for an Eye"	Alan Wareing	Tony Lindsay	3 January 1998	—
A strange man, David Vincent (Colin Baker), turns up at the hospital with a burnt hand. He has a device that can repair the department computers and, when accidentally triggered, causes a power cut. He claims he works for a department that investigates UFOs and made contact with an alien spaceship. His wife turns up and reveals that although he does work for such a department his injury was from an electric fence when breaking into a depot where he believed his superiors were hiding a spaceship; his glowing eyes are contact lenses but his device remains unexplained. A teenage girl, Chloe, is attacked by a girl gang at a mall. Tussling with a slightly reluctant member, Anita, they fall down some stairs and are injured. Anita turns out to be Chloe's sister. A friend of Chloe's committed suicide recently; unknown to her, Anita and the other girls drove her to it with nuisance phone calls. Tina lets it slip and Chloe stabs Anita with scissors. When emergency power fails, George has to operate on her with a headlamp. Elliot stops Chloe stabbing herself and she is arrested. However, Elliot is increasingly stressed after recent experiences and abandons his car at traffic lights. Eve realises Baz has left Charlie after he fails to explain why she hasn't turned up and offers him support. Sunny has Sam move in with him after his break-up with Paul. George and Mark struggle to become a proper couple.
219	19	"Loco Parentis"	Gwennan Sage	Andrew Holden	10 January 1998	—
A youth centre worker (Paul Barber) who has been campaigning against drugs is shot in his home by dealers. His nephew, who was in the cellar at the time, calls an ambulance. In Resus, knowing he is dying, the man gives Charlie a full account of what happened. Charlie passes the information on to the police but it isn't enough to prosecute. The nephew admits he gave the dealers a key to the house and agrees to testify. The town is focusing on a City-United football match and an older man is brought in with a heart attack after learning his grown-up son supports the other team. The son says he has to do it for business reasons; when his father refuses to invest in his failing business, he reveals he never supported his father's team even though he kept dragging him to matches. A woman in her 20s is found by Josh and Penny in a manic state after an embarrassed man calls them to her flat. It turns out she is a student who is behind on her rent; her landlady set her up as a prostitute to pay off the debt but she overdosed on the speed she gave her in preparation. Despite Baz's warning, she intends to carry on. Penny learns Josh is still visiting Liam. Charlie is upset that his and Baz's break-up is common knowledge. Amy tries to set Tina and Sunny up on a date. Mark and George arrive at the department together to try and announce their relationship. At the end of the shift, Laura, an old girlfriend of Mark's, turns up with Jade, the daughter he didn't know existed.
220	20	"Degrees of Separation"	Joanna Hogg	Gil Brailey	17 January 1998	16.88
Mark is trying to adjust to having Laura and Jade in his life but George ends their relationship, unwilling to share him. A youth who works in a bike shop pressures a friend who is leaving town to join him for one last motorcycle rice on the motorway. His friend crashes and sustains a serious head injury, later dying in the hospital; the youth admits he tampered with his accelerator. A vicar brings in a woman (Rita May) who fell from his bell tower while cutting the ropes, having been dismissed from the bell ringers. She claims it is because she jilted him 41 years previous, but in fact, it is because she has arthritis. Eve helps the pair reconcile. Charlie tells Baz he is going to move out. Edmund White, a man who has been out of work since being made redundant two years previous, argues with his wife June (Elizabeth Berrington), who ends up falling over a bannister at their home. At the hospital, it is discovered she is permanently paralysed and Edmund leans on Tina for support. Increasingly manic about the level of care June will need, Edmund, ends up attacking Tina in a deserted corridor as she is leaving work and dragging her into an empty room. When she fails to turn up for their date, Sunny assumes she has stood him up.
221	21	"Secrets"	Michael Owen Morris	Jonathan Rich	24 January 1998	—
Tina comes into work in a distressed state and claims she was mugged. Amy calls her boyfriend Keith, a policeman, but Tina refuses to speak to him. Elliot and Zoe (Tracy-Ann Oberman) show a group of Czech visitors around the department but the still traumatised Elliot tries to resuscitate a corpse in Resus; Charlie gives him the number of a psychologist. A middle-aged salesman (David Hargreaves) who works for his son falls off a treadmill he is demonstrating. Richard realises he has MS but is reluctant to get involved, delegating the task of telling the man's son to Sam. Father and son accept they are better off working separately. A delivery driver comes in with a cut arm but Tina's nervousness means Richard is left treating him alone, and his symptoms mean he messes up the stitches. He gets a parking fine and Sunny sells his bread to pay it off. Richard goes home after getting into an argument with Mark over Laura and Jade visiting him. George goes to see him and he tells her about his MS; George offers her support, despite making it clear she only sees him as a friend. Charlie goes out for dinner with Zoe and ends up going back to her place. Josh and Penny are plagued by hoax calls; the culprit is Liam, feeling abandoned. Josh offers to organise a charity football match to raise money to buy a computer for the children's home where Liam is staying.
222	22	"Love Me Tender"	Gary Love	Tony Lindsay	31 January 1998	—
An Elvis impersonator (Richard Ridings) comes in with chest pains. Richard initially dismisses it as indigestion against Mark's advice, but eventually orders an x-ray, which shows he has peritonitis. Mark convinces the man to give up his Elvis lifestyle and pursue a relationship with his assistant. Josh and Penny bring in Karen (Angela Lonsdale), a woman who has been mugged, and her boyfriend Mike. Sunny recognises Karen as his sister and realises Mike has hit her again. Mike attacks Tina, believing the staff are plotting against him, but is chased off by Sunny and Sam. Karen agrees to stay with Sunny. Baz walks out on the shift after walking in on Charlie kissing Zoe. Eve finds Tina trying to leave and Tina admits Edmund raped her. Eve tells Charlie, who tells the rest of the staff. Charlie and Elliot find the CCTV that should have recorded the attack is useless. The staff gather to offer Tina their support before Eve takes her home.
223	23	"Taking Sides"	Paul Murton	Steve Chambers	7 February 1998	—
Two female boxers take part in an illegal bout, which ends with one of them headbutting the other. The defeated woman is angry since she was hoping to impress a scout from Germany, and starts a fight in reception, during which she is kicked in the stomach and suffers a miscarriage. Charlie manages to reconcile the two women. Tina returns to work, having been staying with Eve. A visit from Karen, who is returning to Liverpool, convinces her to talk to the police, but with no CCTV evidence, the chances of a conviction are slim. An elderly woman is brought in with a cut leg; she has angina and says she is there to see her daughter and the angel Gabriel. Mark thinks she is senile but Tina learns she has come back to Holby to be buried alongside her daughter, who died in a road accident as a child. Sam considers reconciling with Paul but George talks him out of it. Josh is shocked to learn how much money the charity football match needs to raise; he goes all out collecting and eventually donates the last £350 himself. Laura and Jade go to see Mark, with Laura mentioning she has a new boyfriend who isn't interested in Jade, but they disappear after he is called away. Charlie and Mark later find Jade in the car park with a note; Laura has gone, leaving her behind.
224	24	"We Can Be Heroes"	Michael Owen Morris	Jonathan Rich	14 February 1998	16.24
Sam, Sunny, Tina, Eve and Amy attend a self-defence course, where Sam accidentally injures the instructor during a throw. Amy tells Eve she is pregnant. Liam asks Josh to adopt him and Josh has to let him down; Penny is angry with Josh for raising Liam's hopes, explaining that she ended up in a children's home after her mother was injured in a car accident. A woman (Veronica Roberts) with chest pains insists Richard run further tests when he tells her it is just an inflammation, then accuses him of wasting her time when they come back clear. Richard admits to George he's not sure if he can do the job. Baz goes to see her solicitor but Tony McLaughlin bursts into the office, demanding to know where his estranged wife is. He takes Baz hostage when the police turn up looking for him and drives off with her; he is wanted for trying to kill his wife's new boyfriend but has been stabbed. Baz calls Charlie for help and together they patch up McLaughlin and Charlie proposes to Baz. Surrounded by police, McLaughlin tries to shoot Baz but Charlie stops him and McLaughlin is killed by a police sniper. At the hospital, Charlie and Baz announce their engagement.
225	25	"Everlasting Love – Part One"	Nigel Douglas	Barbara Machin	21 February 1998	17.01
It is Charlie and Baz's wedding day; Ash has returned to be best man and Megan and Duffy are also in town. Mike has an awkward return when he runs over Sheila, a middle-aged woman who ran out in front of him while pursuing her granddaughter Jodie. Tina moves in with Sam and Sunny and learns the police have enough forensic evidence to convict Edmund, but when her parents turn up unexpectedly she refuses to see them. Partway through the marriage, the staff receive news of a fire at St Thomas'; they all have to return to duty for the increased workload, including the guests. Sheila's husband Tony blames Mike and it turns out Jodie was trying to find her mother Aly, who lost custody of her while in jail. Ash calls her with Sheila's permission but when she turns up Tony drags the rest of the family outside, where Sheila collapses. Tina's parents (Wanda Ventham and Gordon Langford Rowe) turn up again and Eve tricks her into meeting them. An Asian gangster, Ahman, finds his sister Lamisha with her boyfriend Damian, who she ran away with, and has Damian beaten up and Lamisha, who is ill, taken to the Holby. Mark and Megan convince Charlie they should try to help the couple. Damian is run down outside by an ambulance driven by one of Ahman's henchmen. When Charlie tries to help, he is run over as well.
226	26	"Everlasting Love – Part Two"	Nigel Douglas	Barbara Machin	28 February 1998	15.74
Josh and Penny arrive on the scene and manage to force the stolen ambulance into a wall. Charlie and Damian only have minor injuries. Damian and Lamisha explain Lamisha's father took out a contract on him, which Kalid has been trying to collect; Charlie has him arrested but the couple run away again. Sheila needs treatment for a blood clot and Tony admits he was trying to hold on to Jodie to make up for failing with Aly. Sheila appears to come through the operation but an unusual reaction means she fails to come round from the anaesthetic. Tina learns her father is dying of cancer but is angry that her parents expect her to give up nursing to run the family business. Eve tells them Tina is a good nurse and her father accepts her choices. Elliot is taken to task for reopening an old ward and using unauthorised staff but resigns, fed up of bureaucracy getting in the way of running a decent hospital. Charlie and Baz marry after the ship and at the reception on a boat Liam visits Josh, Amy tells Keith of her pregnancy and Mark and George reconcile. Baz offers to get another job so work doesn't get in the way of their marriage, while Richard decides to resign to take up a research post. Ash admits he and Laura have broken up and he is having difficulty seeing his daughter, and Duffy is also having marriage troubles after Andrew cheated on her. Amy, Tina, Sam and Sunny lift everyone's spirits with a rendition of Everlasting Love.

== Bibliography ==
- Silver, Rachel (1998). Casualty: Behind The Scenes. BBC Worldwide. ISBN 0-563-38467-0.
