= Robert Gwilym =

Welsh actor

Robert Gwilym (born 2 December 1956), sometimes known as Bob Gwilym, is a Welsh actor.

Robert Gwilym was born in Neath, Glamorgan, Wales, where his family owned a chain of lingerie shops. His brother, Mike Gwilym, also made his name as an actor.

Gwilym has appeared on television in a large range of shows, including The Bill, Ultimate Force, Soldier Soldier, Coronation Street, London's Burning, Dancing at Lughnasa, and The Professionals. In 1990 he appeared in a single episode of Casualty, before returning in the regular role of Max Gallagher from 1998 to 2002. His radio work includes playing Corporal Carrot in the BBC Radio 4 adaptation of Terry Pratchett's Discworld novel Guards! Guards!

He starred opposite his brother, Mike Gwilym, in On the Black Hill (1987), based on Bruce Chatwin's novel.

in 2013, he played the role of Frank Bowman in Ian Rankin's debut play Dark Road.
