= Jan Anderson (actress) =

Welsh actress

Jan Anderson (born Janina Anderson; 17 June 1974 in Porthcawl, Bridgend, Wales) is a Welsh actress.

Her late mother was a Welsh horse riding teacher; her late father, an Italian lumberjack. She had an older sister, Ruth, who died in 1998. Anderson joined Pyle-based children's Vagabond Theatre at age seven, with the teacher Trevor Harris. Another influence in her life was drama teacher Roger Burnell at Porthcawl comprehensive school performing with them at The Grand Pavilion until age 13 in productions including starring as Annie in Annie, Juliet in Romeo and Juliet, Cecily in The Importance of Being Earnest, and Lily in Under Milk Wood. She also played in Oklahoma, Damn Yankees and in the role of Baby Jane in Gypsy.

After leaving school at the age of 15, she joined the Welsh National Opera, where she toured with the production of Carmen and studied at the Royal Welsh College of Music & Drama. She was the lead presenter on the HTV Wales programme The Gen.

Her other television credits include Is Harry on the Boat, The Bill, Doctors and London's Burning. She had a role in the 1999 British film Human Traffic, but Jan is mostly known for her role of Chloe Hill in BBC's Casualty from 1998 to 2002.

In the early 2000s, she studied acting in Hollywood, and broke into the US film and TV arena. There, she worked on films including Sony Pictures' Detention, Portal, Three Days Blind, Float, Big Top and Halloween Night. She played Marie in the Torchwood episode "Reset", and had a small role on Prison Break.

In July 2011, Anderson featured in the second episode of the eighth season of Curb Your Enthusiasm, playing the role of Richard Lewis' new girlfriend, Stella. In 2012, she relocated back to the UK, and has since worked on Sky's comedy Trollied. She has also played the role of Katherine in the 2025 video game Kingdom Come: Deliverance II.
