= Claire Goose =

British actress (born 1975)

- Born: 10 February 1975 (age 51); Edinburgh, Scotland
- Education: Italia Conti Academy of Theatre Arts
- Occupation: Actress
- Spouse: Craig Woodrow (m. 2007)
- Children: 2

Claire Goose is a Scottish actress who first gained attention playing Tina Seabrook on the long-running BBC One medical drama Casualty (1997–2000). Her other roles include DS "Mel" Silver in Waking the Dead (2000–2007), Insp. Rachel Weston in The Bill (2008–2009), and Jane Kennedy in The Coroner (2015–2016), for which she was awarded "Best Acting Performance" by the RTS. She narrated the Sky One reality series Road Wars from 2009 to 2010. Her stage credits include The Girl Who Fell (West End, 2019).

== Early life ==
Born in Edinburgh, Goose was raised in Dersingham, England, where her father worked as a general practitioner. She has an elder sister, Caroline, a nursery nurse, and an elder brother, Duncan, who started the One Drinks company. Goose is a former pupil of Wisbech Grammar School, and a graduate of the Italia Conti Academy of Theatre Arts.

== Career ==
Early theatre roles included Addicted to Love, and Hitting Home at the Man in the Moon Theatre. She also appeared in early adverts for Impulse women's body spray. Goose played a main role as nurse Tina Seabrook in Casualty, for no less than 80 episodes between 1997 and 2000. In 1998, she was nominated for the Most Popular Newcomer accolade at the 4th National Television Awards, for her portrayal of the character.

From 2000 to 2004, she played the role of DC/DS Amelia "Mel" Silver for four series of Waking the Dead. She also starred in the 2005 television film Perfect Day.

From August 2008, she played Sergeant, later Inspector, Rachel Weston in ITV's The Bill. The same year she played a leading role as undercover cop Rebecca Ryan/Margaret in the British gangster film Bad Day.

In 2011, she appeared in BBC1 drama Exile with John Simm and, in 2015, appeared in the fourth series of Death in Paradise.

From 2015, she starred as the titular character Jane Kennedy, in the BBC Birmingham daytime drama The Coroner, set in the fictional coastal town of Lighthaven in South Devon. The series ran to 20 episodes. She won Best acting performance at the 2016 Royal Television Society (Midlands awards).

In 2019, she played the lead role of Thea in The Girl Who Fell by Sarah Rutherford at Trafalgar Studios. From 2022, she has starred as Steph in two series of the CBBC teen science-fiction series Silverpoint.

== Personal life ==
In the 1990s, Goose dated her Casualty co-star Jonathan Kerrigan. In 2007, she married TV producer Craig Woodrow. Together they have two daughters, Amelia and Eveline.

== Filmography ==
=== Film ===
| Year | Title | Role | Notes |
|---|---|---|---|
| 2002 | Danny Loves Angela | Angela | Short |
| 2002 | Alone | Alice | |
| 2003 | Friday Night In | Jenny | Short |
| 2008 | Bad Day | Rebecca Ryan / Margaret | |
| 2008 | Second Guest | Suzy | Short |
| 2008 | Barnet Shuffle | Tina | Short |
| 2012 | Candle to Water | Mia | |
| 2013 | Miriam | Female neighbour | Short |
| 2015 | The Rezort | Valerie Wilton | |
| 2019 | Mash | Cathy | Short |

=== Television ===
| Year | Title | Role | Notes |
|---|---|---|---|
| 1989 | The Ruth Rendell Mysteries | Girl on footpath | Episode: "No More Dying Then: Part One" (uncredited) |
| 1995 | The Bill | Stacey Abbot | Episode: "What the Eye Doesn't See" |
| 1996 | Crimewatch | Sam | Episode: #13.1 (uncredited) |
| 1996 | EastEnders | Sally | Episode: #1.1251 |
| 1997–2000 | Casualty | Tina Seabrook | 80 episodes |
| 1999 | Holby City | Tina Seabrook | Episode: "Kill or Cure" |
| 2000–2007 | Waking the Dead | DC/DS Amelia 'Mel' Silver | 41 episodes |
| 2003 | Gifted | Maxine Norris | Television film |
| 2005 | The Afternoon Play | Kate Dobie | Episode: "The Good Citizen" |
| 2005 | Secret Smile | Kerry Cotton | 2 episodes |
| 2005 | Perfect Day | Amy | Television film |
| 2006 | Perfect Day: The Millennium | Amy | Television film |
| 2006 | Perfect Day: The Funeral | Amy | Episode: "The Funeral" |
| 2006 | Love Lies Bleeding | Zara Terry | Television film |
| 2008–2009 | The Bill | Sgt./Insp. Rachel Weston | 42 episodes |
| 2009–2010 | Road Wars | Narrator | Series 7 |
| 2011 | Hustle | Kathleen | Episode: "The Delivery" |
| 2011 | Exile | Mandy | 3 episodes |
| 2012 | Mount Pleasant | Kim | 6 episodes |
| 2013 | Pat & Cabbage | Clare | Episode #1.6 |
| 2014 | Undeniable | Jane Phillips | 2 episodes |
| 2014 | New Tricks | DCI Grace Mackie | Episode: "Breadcrumbs" |
| 2015 | Death in Paradise | Katie Peters | Episode: "Hidden Secrets" |
| 2015 | Unforgotten | Ellie Greaves | 5 episodes |
| 2015–2016 | The Coroner | Jane Kennedy | 20 episodes |
| 2018 | Stan Lee's Lucky Man | Rachel Reeve | 2 episodes |
| 2018 | Dark Heart | Phoebe Kyriacou | 2 episodes |
| 2019 | Murdoch Mysteries | Dr. Katherine Talbot | Episode: "Troublemakers" |
| 2022–2023 | Silverpoint | Steph | 16 episodes |
| 2023 | The Bay | Jacqui Fischer | 6 episodes |
| 2024 | The Cuckoo | Jessica Hayes | 4 episodes |
| 2024 | Dalgliesh | Dr. Emma Lavenham | 3 episodes |
| 2026 | Gone | Claire Sedgwick | 5 episodes |

=== Radio ===
| Year | Title | Role | Notes |
|---|---|---|---|
| 2004 | L'Assommoir | Gervaise | BBC Radio 4 |
| 2007 | About a Dog | Sarah | BBC Radio 4 |

== Awards ==
| Year | Awarding Body | Category | Work | Result | Ref. |
|---|---|---|---|---|---|
| 1998 | 4th National Television Awards | Most Popular Newcomer | Casualty | Nominated | |
| 2016 | Royal Television Society (Midlands) | Best Acting Performance | The Coroner | Won | |
