= Vincenzo Pellegrino =

British actor

Vincenzo David Pellegrino
- Born: 1967 (age 58–59); Wirral, Merseyside, England, UK
- Occupation: Actor
- Years active: 1994–present

Vincenzo David Pellegrino (born 1967) is an English actor who was in hospital drama Casualty from 1997 to 1999. He played Derek (Sunny) Sunderland, a porter.

After leaving Casualty, he worked on Where the Heart Is.

In 2003 & 2005 (2 seasons) Pellegrino played recurring character Dr. Fergus Gallagher, a "Scenes of Crime Officer", in the ITV spin-off of "The Bill".

In 2004, Pellegrino returned to television as Sid Rooney, a careworker in The Story of Tracy Beaker.

In 2017, he played a London Journalist in the three part drama on BBC “Three Girls”.

== Filmography ==
| Year | Title | Role |
|---|---|---|
| 1997–1999 | Casualty | Derek 'Sunny' Sunderland |
| 2004 | The Story of Tracy Beaker | Sid Rooney |
| 2014 | The Adventurer: The Curse of the Midas Box | Grendel |
