= Rebecca Wheatley =

British actress and musician (born 1965)

- Occupations: Actress, singer
- Years active: 1990s–present

Rebecca Wheatley is an actress and musician. While in Casualty, she recorded two UK Top 10 singles: "Everlasting Love" with the Casualty cast, and "Stay With Me (Baby)" solo.
