= Casualty series 22 =

Twenty-second series of Casualty

Casualty
- Series 22
- Starring: Daphne Alexander; Matt Bardock; Ivana Basic; Ian Bleasdale; Susan Cookson; Charles Dale; Peter England; Elyes Gabel; Kip Gamblin; Tristan Gemmill; Sam Grey; Jane Hazlegrove; Gillian Kearney; Joanne King; Simon MacCorkindale; Tony Marshall; Janine Mellor; Matthew Needham; Suzanne Packer; Ben Price; James Redmond; Abdul Salis; Sunetra Sarker; Georgia Taylor; Derek Thompson
- No. of episodes: 48

Release
- Original network: BBC One
- Original release: 8 September 2007 – 9 August 2008

Series chronology
- ← Previous; Series 21 Next → Series 23

The twenty-second series of the British medical drama television series Casualty commenced airing in the United Kingdom on BBC One on 8 September 2007 and finished on 9 August 2008.

== Series overview ==
Like other accident and emergency departments, Holby City Hospital's A&E department is a busy environment involving hospital staff, patients and visitors. The series Casualty explores the personal and professional lives of those within the hospital, interweaving stories about patients and medical emergencies with the relationships and experiences of hospital staff. The hospital drama series has continued for more than 20 years.

Following the tragic death of Selena Donovan at the end of Series 21, the staff of Holby City's Emergency Department find themselves thrown back into the thick of the action. With Corporate Mangager Nathan Spencer (Ben Price) struggling to cope with looking after Angel and new Executive Director Marilyn Fox (Caroline Langrishe) determined to ring in the changes it looks as if the first casualty will be Nathan himself.

Series 22 saw the arrival of many new characters to the team which included F2s Ruth Winters (Georgia Taylor) and Toby De Silva (Matthew Needham), Consultants Adam Trueman (Tristan Gemmill) and Zoe Hanna (Sunetra Sarker), Porter Big Mac (Charles Dale), Receptionist Noel Garcia (Tony Marshall), Paramedics Snezana Lalovic (Ivana Basic) and Curtis Cooper (Abdul Salis), Orthopaedic Consultant Sean Anderson (Richard Dillane) and his wife, Staff Nurse Jessica Harrison (Gillian Kearney) and Clinical Nurse Manager Simon Tanner (Paul Fox).

Dramatic changes in Series 22 included the departures of many beloved characters such as the long serving Josh Griffiths (Ian Bleasdale) and Harry Harper (Simon MacCorkindale) and as the series drew to a close it seemed yet another loved character was due to leave as Dr. Maggie Coldwell (Susan Cookson) quit Holby following a vicious court case.

== Cast ==
=== Main characters ===
- Daphne Alexander as Nadia Talianos (until episode 19)
- Matt Bardock as Jeff Collier (from episode 3)
- Ivana Basic as Snezana Lalovic (from episode 26)
- Ian Bleasdale as Josh Griffiths (until episode 10)
- Susan Cookson as Maggie Coldwell (until episode 48)
- Charles Dale as Big Mac (from episode 13)
- Peter England as Terence "T.C." Cockleton (episodes 4−14)
- Elyes Gabel as Guppy Sandhu (until episode 5)
- Kip Gamblin as Greg Fallon (until episode 23)
- Tristan Gemmill as Adam Trueman (from episode 3)
- Sam Grey as Alice Chantrey
- Jane Hazlegrove as Kathleen "Dixie" Dixon
- Gillian Kearney as Jessica Harrison (from episode 21)
- Joanne King as Cyd Pyke (until episode 3)
- Simon MacCorkindale as Harry Harper (until episode 28)
- Tony Marshall as Noel Garcia (from episode 20)
- Janine Mellor as Kelsey Phillips
- Matthew Needham as Toby De Silva (from episode 1)
- Suzanne Packer as Tess Bateman
- Ben Price as Nathan Spencer (until episode 6)
- James Redmond as John "Abs" Denham
- Abdul Salis as Curtis Cooper (from episode 27)
- Sunetra Sarker as Zoe Hanna (from episode 18)
- Georgia Taylor as Ruth Winters (from episode 1)
- Derek Thompson as Charlie Fairhead (until episode 17, from episode 28)

=== Recurring characters ===
- Robyn Addison as Joanne Coldwell (episodes 22−43)
- Richard Dillane as Sean Anderson (episodes 27−48)
- Danny Emes as Lucas Anderson (from episode 34)
- Miffy Englefield as Amelia Anderson (from episode 34)
- Gregory Foreman as Louis Fairhead (from episode 13)
- Caroline Langrishe as Marilyn Fox (from episode 4)
- Andrew Newton-Lee as Stacey Merrick (from episode 30)
- Sarah-Jane Potts as Ellie Merrick (from episode 30)

=== Guest characters ===
- Sudha Bhuchar as Devika (episodes 4−10)
- Sharon Duce as Sheila Denham (episode 30)
- Paul Fox as Simon Tanner (episodes 39−48)
- Stella Gonet as Jayne Grayson (episodes 28−29)
- Cherie Lunghi as Camille Windsor (episodes 14 and 47−48)
- Amanda Mealing as Connie Beauchamp (episode 2)
- Jack Smethurst as Stan Powell (episode 4)
- Julia St. John as Sarah Evans (episodes 9, 21 and 25)

== Episodes ==
No. overall	No. in series	Title	Directed by	Written by	Original release date	UK viewers (millions)
591	1	"My First Day"	Andy Hay	Mark Catley	8 September 2007	6.08
New F2s Toby De Silva and Ruth Winters arrive for their first shift in the Emergency Department. Toby makes several initial mistakes with one being letting a patient that has overdosed on paracetamol and another being that he fails to insert a simple IV line after 6 years of training. He is then sent out with Dixie when a bomb on a bus explodes on a busy main road. He then realises that the shop that was affected was the same shop as he visited on his way to work. He is then forced to assist Maggie in amputating a lad's arm to save his mother's life. Toby questions his decision to become a doctor and almost quits, when he saves the life of a young diabetic girl caught up in the explosion. Note: First appearance of Ruth Winters and Toby De Silva as F2 Doctors
592	2	"Charlie's Anniversary"	Andy Hay	Mark Catley	9 September 2007	7.04
The episode is a flashback of the previous episode showing Charlies point of view of the events. Charlie is increasingly disillusioned as the staff celebrate his thirty fifth year in nursing. Connie Beauchamp takes temporary control of the ED, in the absence of a Clinical Lead. Charlie subscribes a patient to painkillers only for her to suffer a severe allergic reaction and is reprimanded by Connie. Ruth is coping well under the pressure whilst bad mouthing Toby behind his back and the nursing staff. As the casualties from the explosion are brought in, an unattended bag causes a mass evacuation of the department, and Charlie single handedly apprehends the Animal Rights activist behind the bombing.
593	3	"Meltdown"	Richard Signy	Sasha Hails	15 September 2007	5.78
Selena and Nathan's baby is recovering in the ED, Angel, has been off the ventilator for the past day. Meanwhile a young mother breaks into a house in order to get her baby but the grandmother confronts her on her escape and she suffers a head injury as the mother escapes. The mother is pursued by the father and when she hides, the baby starts screaming she covers his mouth and nose to keep him quiet and hides him in a cement mixer. She then beats the father after he tries to tackle her, he is rendered unconscious. Meanwhile new consultant, Adam Trueman is out for a run when he sees the young mother about to commit suicide off the bridge. He successfully manages to talk her out of it by telling her how she would regret it. Meanwhile the daughter of one of Guppy's patients who died is desperate to speak to him but he gives her the cold shoulder and demands that Alice deals with it, much to Charlie's disgust. Nathan baby's heart keeps stopping so she is put back onto the ventilator, in order to take the strain off of the premature baby's heart. The doctors suggest taking her off the machine after all of her organs are failing after getting an e coli infection. Guppy makes a serious mistake after missing treatment steps in a boy's dislocated ankle, while Ruth had told him what had to be done previously. The psychotic mother escapes after Guppy confronts the grieving daughter. The witness to the attempted suicide that Adam attended turns out to be a reporter trying to get an inside scoop by using Adam. Guppy hands in his hospital pass saying that he is unfit to practice. Note: First Appearance of Adam Trueman (Tristan Gemmill) as a Consultant Doctor, Return of Jeff Collier (Matt Bardock) as a Paramedic, Death of Angel Spencer and departure of Cyd Pyke
594	4	"No End of Blame"	A J Quinn	Patrick Wilde	22 September 2007	6.78
Somebody from the department has been talking to the press about the departments affairs during the bombing that happened in episodes 1 and 2. Harry Harper makes a statement on the news about the news report, defending the department. Meanwhile while driving to the music studio a man spills his coffee over his legs while driving causing him to crash his car. It transpires that his daughter, Susie, was in the boot of the van and was seriously injured in the accident. New receptionist T.C fools Nadia pretending to be a priest when Tess catches him out and gives him a final warning on his first day. Marilyn Fox is dealing with the inquiry and while she interviews Nathan, he blames Charlie for the events and brings up the incident where Charlie prescribed a patient medicine which caused her to have an anaphylactic shock. Alice then confronts Adam about how the press found the information to which he confesses to but Tess covers for him. Guppy confides in Harry about his drug use to which Harry tries to assure Guppy that he can seek help. Susie crashes from an allergic reaction to the medicine, Adam successfully does a surgical airway and then she is transported up to theatre. The trust requests for Nathan Spencer to resign due to the outcome of the inquiry. Note: Arrival of T.C. as a Receptionist and Marilyn Fox as a Trust Executive
595	5	"Sliding Doors"	Farren Blackburn	Rachel Flowerday	29 September 2007	6.37
While Guppy awaits a train into Holby a young boy gets his arm stuck in a grate on the railway line; with a train approaching, his only option is to break the boy's arm and pull him free to save his life. Once in the hospital, the mother threatens to sue Guppy about how he broke her son's arm. Guppy then fails to manoeuvre the bone into position to allow the blood to flow so Kelsey and Maggie are forced to intervene. Meanwhile, an elderly lady from the train is brought in and Toby is assigned to deal with her. After attempting to treat her with Adam's guidance, he once again fails to successfully remove blood from her artery; therefore, Ruth decides to step in. The mother slaps Nathan after he tells her to take her domestic home with her; Nathan calls the police and gets her removed from the department, even though her son is deteriorating in resus for some reason that Guppy can't determine. Guppy then successfully comes to the conclusion that he is a haemophiliac and that the bruises are a symptom and not from his mother or bullies. The boy's brain bleed needs a bore hole operation; the surgeons are busy and Maggie attempts her first ever bore hole procedure with Guppy's guidance as Adam is out on a date and not available to come in. Guppy takes over from Maggie after one failed attempt and tells her she can't continue with her shaky hands. Josh's friends from the previous season, Davika and her daughter, are back for plastic surgery. Charlie comes across as implying that they shouldn't be in the country and won't pay Josh back, which infuriates him. Guppy decides that he will still leave the ED even after having a successful day. Harry returns as the new consultant manager much to everyone's, especially Nathan's, shock. (The train and station scenes were filmed on location at Wirksworth on the Ecclesbourne Valley Railway.) Note: Departure of Guppy Sandhu as a Doctor and the return of Harry Harper as Senior Consultant
596	6	"Core Values"	Robert Del Maestro	Al Smith	6 October 2007	6.93
With Harry's first day back in the ED under his new duties, he is quick to work with helping Toby out with his cases. Harry is ordered to fire Nathan by his superiors, much to Harry's outrage due to his recent losses. Meanwhile during an Army training exercise with live ammo, a medic is hit from behind with a bullet. Nathan slips on spilled coffee banging his head. While Harry is treating Nathan he tells him that he no longer has a job with which Nathan takes in his stride. The soldier collapses after his superior officer tampers with the machines. Ruth forgets to take a simple pregnancy test on a patient and when it looks like this will have repercussions on her when it turns out that she is pregnant, Ruth blames the mistake on Nadia. The soldier later dies after Adam and Maggie try to operate on him. It transpires that the superior is responsible for the shooting, after he was caught stealing and selling army equipment. Note: Departure of Nathan Spencer
597	7	"Inappropriate Behaviour"	Ian Barnes	Michael Jenner	13 October 2007	5.75
Harry introduces a new policy in which they will only take in emergency patients and everyone else will be turned elsewhere. After a drunken night out a woman is raped in a taxi by the driver. The taxi is then involved in a serious RTA after the woman attacks the driver. They plough into a lorry. Harry attends the RTA as the doctor. Ruth tries to hand Toby a drunk patient but Nadia forces her to treat him, it transpires that the patient is Ruth's dad, a drunk/violent man. Adam is forced to restrain Dianne's husband after he attacks the cab driver by ripping the intubation tube from his throat after finding out that he raped his wife. Ruth swaps her blood for her dads blood so that he can pass the blood alcohol test. They agree to go out for coffee together after her shift but her dad has done a runner, Ruth then finds out that the card he claims he wrote for her years ago was bought outside the hospital, he was just using Ruth for his own personal gain.
598	8	"My Aim Is True"	Jill Robertson	Jason Sutton	20 October 2007	5.17
Harry is quickly sending patients out of the ED while dealing with the new policy. Much to Abs' disgust as he thinks he's not putting the patients first. Ruth does her 2nd intubation after Adam suggests she takes over from Toby after he struggles to do it. Adam and Toby successfully fix the light after the electrician is purposely not fixing it in order to waste time while earning money. Adam then shows Toby how to do an intubation, on a dead woman. Much to Alice's disgust, Tess comes storming in and Adam tells Toby not to apologise as it's a teaching hospital. Harry then comes through and tells Adam that the coroners office will have a field day. Adam then tells Harry that the reason behind this is that he doesn't want Toby to fail again. Meanwhile at a wedding a jealous sister poisons the bride, groom and her father with raw chicken. Abs then confronts Harry after a patient he sent home comes back to the ED, this time in resus. Toby successfully does his first intubation thanks to Adam's persistence. Josh offers to marry Davika so that she can have a visa, she does not accept this idea as she does not want to be a burden. Harry decides that he will but a hold on the new policy, but cuts will have to be made in equipment or staff redundancies.
599	9	"As One Door Closes..."	Julie Edwards	Stephen McAteer	27 October 2007	6.91
Josh finds out that Laura Merriman is too mentally unwell to appear in court after stabbing him last season. Harry installs a new Blood gas machine but requires a huge form being filled out each time and each form earns the department money. After being continuously bullied and threatened with a knife on an estate by a group of youths, Matty takes matters into his own hands and strikes back with a knife causing serious harm to the adolescent. Josh has severe flashbacks between this stabbing and his own which makes it difficult for him to work or concentrate. Josh suffers a major panic attack in the ambulance forcing Dixie to call for another unit to take the patient. Toby makes yet another mistake after not log rolling the patient to find the other knife wound, also he has too much faith in the machine and gives the patient too much saline for his hemoglobin levels. Harry orders that no one uses the blood gas machine as it transpires it is giving false readings. Matty tries to run away with his parents to Poland after footage of him initiating the stabbing is found on his phone. As they are driving away they stop after Matty starts to hemorrhage. Adam has been making a blog online and is giving overviews of all the staff names along with nicknames. Marilyn decides that they only need 1 band 8 nurse so either Charlie or Tess needs to go and be replaced with a band 5 nurse to save £1,500. For revenge on Adam's prank Kelsey goes to let down his tyres, she assumes he has the fanciest car, it turns out that instead of his she has flattened Marilyn's.
600	10	"Finding the Words"	Alan Macmillan	Katharine Way & Mark Catley	3 November 2007	6.82
As Adam is telling the family that they could not save their son Toby bursts out laughing and is reprimanded by Adam and sent out on an observation with the paramedics. Davika is leaving for India much to Josh's disappointment as he really loves her. Meanwhile a family are walking through the woods when a car careers off the road through a field, runs down the mother and crushes the granddad into a tractor all the while with the young daughter staring on. It turns out that the driver was a drug mule and a package leaked into his stomach causing him to crash and subsequently die. The grandfather is in a very bad way and Toby tells him that he will probably die as the pressure of the tractor is keeping him alive, he later passes away and Toby faces his demons and tells the family while trying to keep his nerve. Ruth humiliates Adam as when he is trying to tell a woman her brother has died she wears a red nose trying to embarrass him, Adam asks why and she replies that if he doesn't take the blog down she will start acting like her nickname. Harry tries really hard to avoid Charlie or Tess being made redundant but is left with no choice but to let one of them go by Christmas. Josh decides that he will try and pursue this love life with Devika and jumps on the next plane to India. Note: Final appearance of Josh Griffiths as a Paramedic
601	11	"A House Divided"	Christopher King	Daisy Coulam	10 November 2007	7.07
After a late night out Toby and Kelsey are feeling the effects of their hangovers. A drug addict who is going to an appointment to sort her life out leaves her son, William, at his grandma's house. Unbeknownst to her, her ex-boyfriend, Steve, is in the grandmothers house trying to see their son. He is cooking meth when he accidentally knocks over the pan, blowing up the house. Harry offers Tess a transfer to outpatients and tells both her and Charlie that they have to find the blogger by the end of the day and terminate the site. They corner Adam in a room and tell him that they won't name him, he doesn't own up and tells them that he would never confuse them with 'they're', like the blogger has. Toby cheers Kelsey up with a bacon roll after she was kicked to the floor in cubicles. Adam drops Toby in about being the blogger as he is the only staff member that has been in every single day that the blog was written. He fully denies these claims. Tension rises between Charlie and Tess over who is going to be transferred. As William begins to crash the fire alarm in the department goes off causing an evacuation of the hospital. Steve gets aggressive and attacks Toby and then starts kicking off in resus and shouting at his ex and grandma. Tess, Charlie and Abs are forced to lock him in the other resus and barricade the door with a trolley while waiting for security. Greg has successfully got the post as a rapid response member. The full script for the episode can be read on the BBC website.
602	12	"Strangers When We Met"	David Bartlett	Jason Sutton	17 November 2007	6.66
Greg is struggling with his rapid response training because he is failing to stick to the protocol. While out on his first solo call he comes across a malicious call where a young lad is riding on top of cars. As he drives away from the scene it turns out the lad has gone onto the rapid response car's roof. When Greg brakes he goes flying off injuring himself. Ruth is sent out on an observation shift with Greg after excelling with treating the patients. Ruth then mistakenly gives the patient the wrong medicine causing him to fit. When Adam calls Ruth into his office she is ready to come clean about the incident until he congratulates her and tells her that she will be a consultant very soon. Rod's, Greg's superior officer's, daughter is found having an asthma attack on top of scaffolding. Greg tries his best to save her but his efforts are in vain when she later passes away. He then snaps at Dixie and storms out of the ambulance depot.
603	13	"How Soon Is Now?"	Ian Barnes	Ian Kershaw	24 November 2007	6.33
With Ruth struggling to treat her patient she asks Adam to step in and with a little prompt she reaches the correct course of action. The patient is then stabbed by his brother in resus and dies from his new injuries. The police turn up and begin to interview all of the staff. Charlie turns up late for work after dropping Louis off at school. Harry tells him that he is not in a position to ask for favours after he asks for their meeting to be rescheduled. After smoking in the school store room, Louis and his friends accidentally set fire to the school. With resus closed because the police are examining the crime scene from earlier, Harry decides to upgrade HTC into the temporary resus. With the help of Big Mac, Toby manages to successfully unmask the true culprit behind toxicshark.com, T.C. Toby is forgiven of the false accusations and allowed to do proper doctoring duties instead of cleaning and laundry. After a gas canister explodes in the storeroom the teachers begin to evacuate. As they are trying to escape they are greeted by a fire door with a chain around it, forcing them to turn back to look for a different route out. Greg is first on the scene and despite Dixie's orders he enters the burning building, saving a whole classroom full of pupils. After hearing more screaming from inside the building, Greg ventures back in to find a girl impaled by a plank of wood. While treating her he begins to succumb to the smoke and he is then saved by the fire brigade. Charlie starts to think that the worst has happened to Louis after there has been no sighting of him leaving the building. Charlie finds out that Louis is safe as he skipped school after starting the fire, leaving every other pupil in the path of the impending fire. Adam calls Alice 'squeak' one too many times and she finally tells him her true feelings, about how he is being insensitive to both staff and patients. T.C. and Kelsey are put on punishment duties after Kelsey helps T.C. set up a prank to apologise for his recent blogging which causes Harry to have to lay down the law. Note: Arrival of Big Mac as a porter
604	14	"Inheritance"	Ian Barnes	Rachel Flowerday	1 December 2007	6.92
Charlie is still struggling to cope with Louis and while trying to ensure he doesn't skip school again he ends up missing yet another HR meeting. The board decides that the blog T.C. made was out of order and to terminate his contract within the department. Charlie gives him a second chance but revokes this after T.C. is caught selling goods on hospital premises. Meanwhile a GP is brought into the hospital after collapsing, Toby calls her partner without consent and the doctor is forced to tell him she is HIV +ve. As her partner goes to leave her son blocks him and punches him in the face, sharing blood, possibly infecting him. Toby's mum, Professor Windsor, visits the hospital for a lecture and to check up on Toby but witnesses him having a very bad day after a patient refuses to let him treat them. Louis gets expelled from school and Charlie goes to pick him up but he is not there. When he checks their house he finds a large bundle of money hidden in a shoebox. Tension rises between Dixie and Greg after Greg has to deal with a solo call to treat a security guard and no ambulance comes for over an hour. The patient later dies causing Greg to begin to lose faith in his job. Note: Departure of T.C. as a Receptionist
605	15	"Behind Closed Doors"	Lance Kneeshaw	Mark Catley	8 December 2007	6.95
Toby is struggling to cope with the job and writes a resignation letter addressed to Harry. While Mac is mopping the floor he carelessly leaves wet patches around, one of which Adam slips on. Big Mac then once again goes on about how he can't clean it because of his back and how he can not push patients over 15 stone. Maggie desperately pleads to Toby that he is making a mistake but Toby tells her to stop interfering. A majorly obese man collapses in his house and is brought in via ambulance. Adam makes his feelings over the patient known to Harry and tells him that they should stop treating overweight patients who are just killing themselves anyway. Meanwhile in an out of the way farm a man slips into a machine and mutilates his foot, Ruth decides to use this as her chance to impress Marilyn in order to rotate over to surgery. Yet Adam decides to let Toby deal with him much to Ruth's disgust as he is resigning so has no real benefit for him. Louis ransacks Charlie's locker after he takes his phone to punish him. Tensions come to head in resus as Harry and Adam fight after a death to find ways to blame each other for who was the cause of the man's death. Louis then storms in to argue with Charlie to get his phone back. Maggie loses her temper and tells everyone to sort it out. She then forcibly removes Louis from the hospital for lying to her. She then tries to assure Toby to stay after he succeeds in doing a textbook manoeuvre. After he decides to withdraw his resignation he decides to skip out on the pub and sleep in the on call room after moving out of his parents' house, as he begins to undress he finds Ruth already sleeping there as there is still a loud party outside her house. As Toby falls asleep on the chair Ruth asks him if everyone hates her but he doesn't hear her and her cries for help once again go on unnoticed.
606	16	"Snowball"	Lance Kneeshaw	Suzie Smith	15 December 2007	6.76
Harry has a difficult decision to make as the board want a decision of whether Charlie or Tess will be made redundant, he tells the pair that voluntary redundancy of one of them would be the favourable option. During a peaceful protest by blocking a minor road with bins to stop cars from speeding, an elderly protester suffers an angina attack. Greg goes to respond when he is blocked from getting there by an arrogant gentleman, the man then punches Greg in the face. Dixie warns him that they will be having words after the shift. Kelsey starts to spread more rumours that Ruth and Toby slept together. Maggie tells Ruth that Toby will do Resus today in order to boost his confidence much to her dismay. Louis's school calls once again which forces Charlie to miss even more time of work even though it's the day that Harry will decide who will be redundant. It transpires that Louis was caught smoking Cannabis. Maggie offers Toby her spare room for him to stay in. Tess then approaches Harry and tells him that she volunteers to be made redundant.
607	17	"(What's so funny 'bout) Peace Love and Understanding"	David O'Neill	Gert Thomas	22 December 2007	8.18
It's Tess' last day before she will be made redundant, while Charlie and Tess drop Louis off at a friends house they witness a woman being dragged under a car. Meanwhile an overweight woman comes into the hospital with stomach pains when it turns out that she has lost her baby. Toby realises that she may be cheating on her husband, Charlie tells him to tread carefully. After the woman phone's Charlie she tells him where she hid the baby, Charlie gets a lift from Dixie and Jeff and they find the baby, freezing cold. Jeff places the baby inside his top as Charlie says it's the best way to warm it up. As they make their way back Charlie gets out the ambulance after seeing Louis, who didn't turn up at his friends house, walking down the street. As he follows Louis he comes across the car from earlier that ran down the woman. The man then hits Charlie after the police give chase. The team give Tess a send off and they arrange a trip for her to go see her son, Sam. After Toby's patient, the woman with the baby, crashes he performs a solo cardiac shock. After Maggie congratulates him, he snogs Maggie under the mistletoe. Charlie suspects that something more may be going on between the two doctors. After Charlie tells the man who dragged the woman under the car that she died, Charlie punches the patient after he makes remarks about her, the patient retaliates injuring Charlie. Harry asks for Charlie's resignation, to which Charlie accepts in order to let Tess keep her job and to spend more time with Louis. Note: Temporary Departure of Charlie Fairhead as Clinical Nurse Manager
608	18	"Take a Cup of Kindness"	Paul Murphy	Sasha Hails	29 December 2007	7.14
With the year drawing to an end Kelsey, Abs and Harry's daughter go to the Paradise club to end the year in style. Meanwhile a boy, Dean, with mental issues brandishes a gun in his mother while wearing his dads old army clothes. Meanwhile new doctor, Zoe Hannah's car runs out of petrol and she goes to a nearby farm house looking for fuel when she comes across the mother that has been shot. Meanwhile a girl that has been brought in after a car accident is clear of spinal injuries by Ruth, the girl later tries to stand up to go to the toilet but collapses and can not feel her legs. Meanwhile at the Paradise club Dean has managed to gain entry, looking for his target. As the nurses and Big Mac pop open a bottle of champagne at midnight, Tess storms in sending them all back to work. Kelsey and Abs, first on scene, give a young girl a tracheotomy with a straw much to Dixie and Jeff's praise. Abs follows Dean upstairs to try and treat him when he aims the gun at Abs. Back in the hospital, Ruth lies to Tess about what happened to the patient and blames what happened on Nadia and that she never said to discharge the patient or remove the collar. Note: Arrival of Zoe Hanna as a Consultant Doctor
609	19	"For Auld Lang Syne" (Note: See also "For Auld Lang Syne" series 28)	Paul Murphy	Sasha Hails	30 December 2007	6.97
After Abs suffers a gun shot wound after trying to calm down Dean, Tess begins to prepare the department for the impending rush of patients from the shooting. Marilyn is forced to scrub up and is given all of the gruesome task from Tess. Dean is shot by the police and is rushed into resus, where he crashes yet still dies even after she performs a tracheotomy. Tess treats Abs and tells him that the trust can not be held responsible and will not let Abs help out. He disregards Tess' orders and gets Dean's mum to open up and to tell the police that it was Dean who shot her. Adam's patients waters break just as he is about to leave for a party. Adam and Alice then begin to take her up to the ward when the elevator breaks. After receiving a call from his girlfriend asking where he is, the sound of the woman in labour makes her think that Adam is cheating on her and she breaks up with him. The pair are forced to deliver the baby in the lift. Adam's claustrophobia begins to worsen forcing Alice to take the lead in helping to birth the baby. Tess warns Ruth and Nadia that one of them is lying and that she wants the truth by the end of the day or there will be a formal investigation of how the patient was injured in the hospital. With Harry's daughter still missing after the shooting, he snaps at Marilyn after she complains about missing pudding even with all of the injured patients who are also not here by choice. When Harry's daughter turns up, it transpires that Dean has hid his younger sister in the car after he could not bring himself to kill her. Nadia decides to take full responsibility and hands in her resignation to Tess. Note: Departure of Nadia Talianos as a Nurse
610	20	"Broken Homes"	Diana Patrick	Steve Keyworth	5 January 2008	7.76
New receptionist Noel he is quick at pulling pranks and joking with colleagues. A young hitchhiker, Joe, catches a lift from a lorry driver, after she brandishes a screwdriver on him they swerve off the road into a caravan. Abs calls for a nurse meeting after receiving a letter from the nurses union about Charlie's situation, the union decide not to support them and Abs decides that the nurses will do an unofficial work-to-rule where the nurses will do the bare minimum as stated in their contract. Ruth goes out to the accident scene as the response doctor after a prolonged entrapment. Ruth makes another careless mistake after not checking how much morphine Greg gave Claire before giving her more causing a morphine overdose. Ruth then begins to insinuate to the boyfriend that she knows that he is beating Claire and locking her in the caravan but it turns out that it is her that is neglecting him. Marilyn threatens Kelsey that if this work-to-rule continues then another nurse might lose their job. After the driver of the lorry dies Zoe blames Abs for his death, Abs then makes an inspirational speech about how he is not the issue and how hard nurses work and that they go above and beyond their job description yet when they do what they're paid to do they are blamed for negligence. Note: Arrival of Noel Garcia as a Receptionist
611	21	"Adrenaline Rush"	Diana Patrick	Stephen McAteer	12 January 2008	7.83
In a chocolate factory a man has fallen into a chocolate vat. Dixie jumps in to rescue him after he starts to drown, she then gets stuck and begins to sink with the patient but is rescued by the fire brigade. Meanwhile a woman's leg is amputated when a train runs over it and is brought into resus. New nurse Lewis is straight into resus but Tess quickly sends him out due to his lack of experience. Kelsey and Alice set up dating sites after Adam suggests it to them. The patient from the chocolate factory stops breathing for no reason while being treated by Lewis and is rushed into resus where Harry praises Lewis for his quick response. It turns out that the woman wanted the train to amputate her leg so Zoe diagnosed her with BIID (Body Integrity Identity Disorder, desire for elective impairment). After Maggie interferes with Zoe's patient, Zoe makes it clear to Maggie that she won't tolerate it. Her patient then begins to spasm while Lewis takes her up to theatre. Tess shares her suspicions about Lewis to Abs. While Tess is taking a patient's body to the morgue she is ambushed by Lewis who injects her with the same substance he gave to the other patients. Big Mac finds her and races her into resus. The team begin to treat her and as she begins to regain consciousness she warns the team that it was Lewis and they seal off the hospital. Big Mac successfully manages to apprehend him. Lewis says that he did what he did, so that he could then save their lives in resus and impress other people. After the shift Adam goes out to an engagement party where he meets Jessica Harrison and they have a one night stand together. Note: Arrival of Jessica Harrison as an Agency Nurse
612	22	"Take it Back"	Nic Phillips	Rachel Flowerday	19 January 2008	8.15
When Adam awakens from his one night stand he heads to work and finds out that she is the new nurse at the ED. The pressure builds for Tess after Harry is not fulfilling his promise of new nurses with a lot of patients breaching 4 hours. Meanwhile in a car workshop a man severs an artery in his leg with a power saw. Toby and Ruth treat him and Maggie is forced to tie off the artery out of theatre as no surgeons are available. Ruth and Zoe are treating an overdose patient who took the pills after realising he would never get out of his debt. Ruth becomes emotional after his death, blaming herself. Just as Toby and Maggie are leaving for a meal, Maggie's daughter turns up and tells her that she is pregnant. Tess tells Jessica that the agency have decided to keep her on in Holby.
613	23	"Where's the Art in Heartache"	Nic Phillips	Jason Sutton	26 January 2008	7.69
Maggie's daughter begins her contractions, Jeff is injured in a pub brawl making Greg consider whether he should resign after Dixie calls him a liability. While vandalising the underside of a bridge, the man slips and is left dangling down from the bridge. Greg is first on the scene. The rope snaps and he falls onto the road causing a car pile up. As Greg checks out the damage he finds that his patient from last week, Ruby, was involved in the crash. Chloe, the mother, has been impaled through the stomach and is trapped in the car. A chemical from a van begins to spread across the scene causing the fire brigade to tell the paramedics to retreat. Chloe passes away and Greg tells Ruby that her mother is just sleeping. Back in the hospital Ruth is treating the graffiti artist in cubicles while Adam treats Ruby, After Adam requests a blood gas for Ruby, Kelsey tells him that seen as she is on an agency shift she can not do them much to Adams disgust. Kelsey asks Adam to step outside where she tells him that she is not impressed with his attitude. Tess is forced to close the department as they can not cope with all the patients, even though Dixie and Jeff are literally minutes away they are forced to divert to St James, an extra 10 minutes away. It then transpires that the chemical was Carbon tetrachloride, Ruby dies after Adam, Kelsey and Zoe try desperately to resuscitate her for 30 minutes. Tess shouts at Abs blaming the work-to-rule in causing the death of the elderly man, that Dixie had in the ambulance, and Ruby. The department gather outside to see themselves in graffiti as the graffiti artist from earlier made them a tribute. Note: Departure of Greg Fallon as a Paramedic
614	24	"Before a Fall"	Ian Barnes	Dana Fainaru	2 February 2008	8.47
Abs once again decides to call another nurse meeting and says that the work-to-rule is being called off, Tess makes an inspirational speech to the nurses praising them as the reason the department operates as smoothly as it does. Marilyn blames Tess that the department should not have been closed where Tess tells her that if Charlie was still here then they would not have had to close the department. Ruth is tasked to deal with a 6 year old girl who fell while playing in a play area. Adam and Jessica treat an autistic child and Jessica contradicts all of Adam's decisions. Ruth is then given a drunk patient to deal with and she tells him that he needs to sleep it off. Adam is about to sedate the boy in order to suture his head injury when Jessica calls him out on his plan and tells him that she doesn't agree with it. It then transpires that the patient Ruth said was a drunk suffered a major brain bleed and his blood is not clotting. He dies in resus, Harry tries to ensure her that she is not to blame herself for what has happened. She then proceeds to tell the autistic child that Adam and Jess treated that his dad has died when they find a picture of the boy in the fathers wallet. Tess' emotions finally come to light after she exposes her true feelings to Harry about the stress on the department. Ruth apologises to the department for her mistake and Adam replies by telling her that it was okay as Toby kills patients every day. She goes home to write in her diary. Abs and Toby decide to surprise her in order to cheer her up when they find Ruth hanging by her neck from the ceiling. She is rushed into resus where the team try desperately to save her.
615	25	"Sex and Death"	Ian Barnes	Mark Catley	9 February 2008	8.31
Following Ruth's suicide attempt, Harry reads through her diary as the events of the past few months are revealed through the use of flashbacks. It begins with her arrival to the hospital and then about her family. It then shows that Adam set Ruth up to shadow the histology department much to Ruth's annoyance but she decided to stay there. Ruth's histology friend, Dominic, manages to secure her a slot in assisting Sarah Evans in surgery on Boxing Day. She then feels led on by Dominic which in turn adds to her depression when he turns her away. Ruth's suicide letter states that her life is summed up by 3 pieces of paper: a birthday card from a father that never loved her, a Christmas card from a man she thought did and a visiting order from her brother. After the incident the team go to the pub to drown their sorrows where Maggie feels bad after Ruth previously asked her for guidance to which she refused to help. Adam and Zoe share a kiss outside the pub where they decide that they are not compatible and to forgot about the incident. Adam then continues to flirt with Jessica and offers to walk her home. Harry tells Tess that the department has let Ruth down by not being there for her. The full script for the episode can be read on the BBC website.
616	26	"Say Say My Playmate"	Julie Edwards	Abi Bown	16 February 2008	7.71
Toby calls off work sick and Harry is desperate to see him to check on how he is coping after Ruth's suicide attempt. He does not want the department to fail Toby as well as Ruth. Everyone is directed to Holby after St James deals with a major RTA. Meanwhile a group of 3 kids run through the woods after overdosing on antidepressant pills. After bumping into an estranged old man the boy ends up stabbing the man in the stomach. Marilyn tries to force Harry to sign off on a press report that says that Ruth could not cope and that it was her own fault. While attending the call to the woods, Dixie, Jeff and Snezana manage to get the ambulance stuck in the mud. Meanwhile at the pub Toby is forced to help deliver Maggie's daughters baby while he is under the influence of alcohol. Dixie and Jeff do not notice the girl in the woods and leave to assist Toby, presuming the call is a hoax, only to find the stabbed man in the middle of the road. Johanne's baby's cord is stuck and Toby calls Tess to try to get help as the ambulance has been delayed. When the paramedics arrive Snezana argues with Dixie over whether they should risk delivering the baby in the pub or attempt to transport her to the hospital. Toby is given the final decision and chooses to deliver the baby in the pub. The young girl who was in the woods with the boys collapses and is found by police and brought in. Adam, Harry and Kelsey treat her when she begins to deteriorate. They then discover that her friend was the one who stabbed the elderly man with dementia who is fighting for his life in resus. Harry refuses to let Maggie have a few hours off to see her daughter in maternity. Harry then gives Toby a week off for compassionate leave if he agrees to see a specialist. Marilyn threatens him that if he goes public with Ruth's diary then the board will ensure that he loses his job. Note: Arrival of Snezana Lalovic as a Paramedic
617	27	"Silent All These Years"	Julie Edwards	Laura Watson	1 March 2008	7.63
Toby returns after his compassionate leave and tells Harry that he thought that him of all people would have supported Ruth after reading the newspaper article. Curtis and Jeff bring in a patient with a severe leg injury, Sean Anderson comes down to the department to assist Toby and Zoe in treating the patient. Dixie and Snezana bring in a young girl who has been impaled in the neck by a bracket, Harry tells Toby that the two of them will work together on the case. Toby manages to form a connection with the patient and successfully manages to treat her, Harry treats the mother and discovers that she has been burned by an iron on her back, she confides in Harry over how her husband has been beating her. After Toby's patient begins to deteriorate Tess suggest paging Harry, Toby then puts Martha to sleep in order to intubate her, when he can't fit the tube down her throat he is forced to perform a surgical airway, Adam tries to stop him as he has not been trained but Harry decides to let him try and encourages him. After he successfully manages the airway, he is praised by the team. Adam criticises Harry over leaving Toby by himself when Harry tells him that him flirting with Jessica wasn't exactly productive either, Adam then tells him that he had already offered his services earlier to which Harry refused. Noel breaks patient confidentiality after telling the woman's abusive partner that she is in cubicles. It then transpires that the husband is not only abusing the mother but also the daughter. A formal complaint is lodged against Jeff after he makes offensive and racist remarks towards a patient. Harry reaches out to the press and gives them Ruth's diary as he believes it will help hundreds of F2's like her. Note: Arrival of Sean Anderson as a consultant in orthopaedics and Curtis Cooper as a Paramedic
618	28	"Thicker than Water" "To Serve and Protect"	Robert Knights	Jason Sutton	8 March 2008	7.09
With Ruth now off life support, she is beginning to recover but is still not awake, Adam braces the team that they will make one final attempt to take Ruth off of sedation and warns them that they should say their farewells. Harry is brandished by the press as part of the cover up, Marilyn tries to make a scapegoat out of Harry after the public cry for the boards resignation. The team applaud Harry for his actions when he then tells them that this will be his last day as consultant manager of the department. Meanwhile a construction worker falls from his site and is rendered unconscious, during his fall his building materials also land on other workers and on a car. Adam and Harry clash while treating the man who fell and argue over whether to intubate or not, their argument spills out of resus and into the corridors where Adam questions him as to why he waited so long to release the diary. Charlie is working in a Health Centre where he is treating a patient with whiplash. Marilyn makes an official press conference criticising Harry's actions, he then suggests to Adam that he should become the next Clinical lead which Adam declines. After Harry's departure, Toby finally manages to pluck up the courage to visit Ruth when after speaking to her, she begins to move. Harry decides to play one last ace by inviting Charlie to return to the ED. Note: Departure of Harry Harper as Clinical Lead and Return of Charlie Fairhead as a Nurse. This episode was billed on listings sites and even on the BBC's iPlayer "watch again" site as having the episode title 'To Serve and Protect'. However the definitive on-screen title was 'Thicker than Water'.
619	29	"Diamond Dogs"	Robert Knights	David Bowker	15 March 2008	7.97
Everyone prepares to celebrate Charlie's return by decorating the department appropriately but are disrupted when Marilyn scolds them and forces them to take down the banners and balloons. Zoe is preparing for an interview for Harry's job, against Maggie who is also trying to become clinical lead. Ruth is now fully conscious and decides to discharge herself from the hospital. Meanwhile an unsuspecting woman is attacked by a dog (because of an irresponsible owner) in her own garden and is rushed into the ED. Abs receives a call and is told that his brother, Danny, has died after taking a drug overdose. Marilyn, Jayne and Sean decide that the decision between Maggie and Zoe is too close and plans on shadowing both staff members around the department for the day. The rampaging dog continues by attacking two community police officers and two civilians. While attending to an emergency call, Jeff is assaulted by a group of gangsters throwing bottles and stones. Adam's patient is threatened by a large man and when Adam tries to intervene, in order to keep his patient safe, he is head butted and receives a broken nose. Charlie confronts Marilyn how the security at the hospital is atrocious and that she needs to put more safeguards in place for the safety of the staff. Maggie offers Ruth a room in her house until she is back on her feet. Marilyn offers Zoe the job as the new clinical lead after being unimpressed by Maggie running off to persuade Ruth to move in with her instead of treating her patients.
620	30	"Face the World"	David Innes Edwards	Jeff Young	22 March 2008	7.14
Tess persuades Abs to go to his brothers funeral in order to comfort his mum. Curtis and Snezana attend an RTC where 2 women suffer possible spinal injuries. It transpires that the accident was staged in order to claim insurance. Alice manages to secure a date from her online dating site when she begins to have second thoughts. Big Mac uses a fake profile in order to get a date with Kelsey but then stands her up due to nerves. Tensions are heated when Abs tries to reconcile a relationship with his mum. A brawl erupts at Danny's wake when Abs best mate gets into a heated argument with his step-dad. After a trying day Abs manages to hold a conversation with his mum about his future plans of opening up an alcohol help clinic after promising his best mate that he would help him to get past his alcohol addiction.
621	31	"To Thine Own Self Be True"	Robert Bierman	Patrick Wilde	29 March 2008	7.23
Today is Jessica's first day as a permanent nurse in Holby and also Zoe's first day as clinical lead. Meanwhile two jealous boys, Jake and Danny, fight over a girl, Karen, in the boxing ring when both of them wind their way into the ED after they brawl outside the ring. Jeff and Dixie attend a call out to a drag queen. Lou, who has collapsed after a performance and bring him into the hospital. Zoe and Maggie argue over budget cuts when Zoe tells Maggie that Ruth needs to come back into work as she is still being paid a full wage, which she would rather spend on a locum doctor. Toby was about to begin his orthopedic rotation with Sean Anderson when it transpires that Maggie told Sean that Toby is not prepared for it. Maggie and Zoe treat Jake when they discover he has severe bruising on his back and he can no longer feel his legs. Zoe discovers the reason behind Lou's discomfort is that his liposuction site has become infected. Danny finally reveals to Jake that he has no interest in Karen as he is gay and the three friends reunite. Jessica is left distraught as Adam gets into a taxi with another woman.
622	32	"Bricks and Daughters"	Robert Bierman	Paul Jenkins	5 April 2008	7.52
Today is Ruth's first day back after her attempted suicide and she is placed on non-clinical duties, it is also Toby's first day of his orthopedic rotation. Dixie and Jeff bring in an elderly man, Emanuel, suffering from suspected dementia. Ruth and Toby tend to the patient but Ruth is disappointed when she realises her role will only involve gown-changing and information gathering. Adam arrives into work late and is told by Zoe to get his act together. Toby struggles with his first dislocation and Maggie is forced to step in and assist. Meanwhile in an illegal hippy hostel, an arsonist blows up the building after the police arrive to stop the illegal rave, Elyssa goes back in to collect her belongs when the blaze begins, causing burns and internal bleeding. Zoe treats Elyssa and requires an orthopedic surgeon to come down and examine her, Sean sends Toby down much to Tess' disappointment. Maggie once again goes behind Toby's back and calls Sean Anderson down to intervene. It transpires that Toby did the band wrong and almost caused the patient to bleed to death. A shoplifter attempts to avoid the police by setting off the fire alarm and amid the distraction Maggie's granddaughter, Lana, is abducted out of Tess' office by the patient with suspected dementia. Maggie then finds Emanuel holding Lana over the rubbish shoot, Ruth successfully manages to talk the Doctor out of dropping the baby, successfully saving her life.
623	33	"Someone's Lucky Night"	Jon Sen	Mark Cairns	12 April 2008	6.76
The department is understaffed on a busy Friday night, Ruth is determined to help out but Charlie firmly puts her back in her place. To make matters worse there's a bug spreading round the hospital causing Tess and Kelsey to be sent home. Charlie and Abs work together to find the cause and begin to suspect the donuts that Noel has been giving out. Jessica treats a young girl of whom she suspects is being abused by her mother when Jess has to attend to another patient, Toby discharges the girl, leaving Jess devastated. Once Jess realises what has happened the young girl ends back up in the hospital, this time by ambulance. Meanwhile Sam Baxter is attacked on his stag night by a group of drunks after making remarks about their appearance. The mother of the frightened girl makes a complaint about Jessica to Charlie who promptly brushes her off to Ruth after discovering that it is not the donuts but instead, norovirus that is being spread through contact with vomit and diarrhea. Adam finds himself in a difficult predicament after he discovers that Sam has been anally raped by the "mugger", he seeks guidance from Maggie as he begins to struggle. Charlie has Abs look into what equipment and cubicle was used for the patient with the norovirus but he ends up coming down with the bug himself along with the frightened girl. Ruth makes a brilliant diagnosis and discovers that the girl is not abused by her mother but in fact has brittle bones, Maggie lets Ruth start to treat patients again but she struggles keeping her cool when inserting needles. Adam convinces Sam to tell his girlfriend he was raped and when he does she makes him swear he will take it no further but when he sees one of his attackers in the ED he decides that he has to report it causing their engagement to shatter. Jessica tries to make amends with Adam but still pushes off his sexual advances, she then invites him out for breakfast only for the police to arrive and distract his attention while Jessica makes her exit. It transpires that she is married to Sean Anderson in this episode.
624	34	"Walk the Line"	Jon Sen	Rachel Flowerday	19 April 2008	6.42
Jessica and Sean take their children to school; they are still keeping their marriage secret from the rest of the staff, while Sean is continuing to see Zoe. Ruth returns to clinical duties and helps out with a stabbing victim but backs away from assisting with a diabetic. A young teenage boy, Daz, hangs around outside a house until chased away by the owner and later has a panic attack on a bus and jumps out of the emergency exit window in front of a car. He seems to have traumatic amnesia and, when he turns out to be allergic to latex, Sean remembers him as the only survivor of a multi-car pile-up in which his parents and sister were killed, which he has repressed; he now lives with his uncle Terry. Zoe bluntly tells him of his parents' death and Terry and Snezana help him through his renewed grief. Snezana later looks at a photo of a little girl. Abs' friend Stacey is fired from work after being accused of being drunk and proceeds to get drunk at home and burn his arm cooking. His girlfriend Ellie takes him into work but he refuses Abs' offer of help, crashing his car while trying to leave. Ruth, unaware of the full situation, allows him to discharge himself. With help from Alice, Adam arranges a romantic meal in the car park with Jessica. They kiss but she dashes off, saying it can't work. Guest Starring Craig Roberts as Darren "Daz" Smith, Ian Hughes as Terry Fishlock and Sarah McVicar as Sandra Chiltern
625	35	"The Great Pretenders"	Piotr Szkopiak	Jack Kelsey	26 April 2008	6.56
Ruth deals with Gordon, who has dislocated his shoulder, but is unable to relocate it and has to call Toby for help. Curtis and Snezana are called out to an estate where a young man, Ben, has been stabbed. Curtis manages to hide the fact he knows Ben from his time with a gang. A young man, Kay, and his mother Hasina learn their house has been put up for sale. Husband and father Khalid has lost his job and is secretly working as a taxi driver but Kay thinks he is having an affair and tries to burn his things. Hasina accidentally causes an explosion by throwing the petrol can onto the fire and is badly burned. Ruth convinces Charlie and Maggie to let her talk to Khalid before she is intubated but she later dies in Resus. Alice goes on a date with internet partner Bruce and kisses him but is reluctant to invite him in. She finds her mother Julie attending to a gentleman caller and texts Bruce saying they shouldn't meet again. Joanne kisses Toby. Ruth returns home with some pills. Guest starring George Young as Bruce Ellis, Shobu Kapoor as Hasina Hussain, Ian Lavender as Gordon Cunningham and Rosie Rowell as Julie Chantrey
626	36	"Love Is..."	Piotr Szkopiak	Sasha Hails	3 May 2008	6.17
Ruth is seemingly writing a suicide note but is interrupted by Maggie and goes out for a run. Parents Mike and Gill pick up their daughter Rose, who has Down's syndrome, from a care centre and learn she is dating one of the other attendees, David, who gives her a letter. Mike and Rose argue in the street and Rose collides with Ruth, who stops her being hit by a motorcyclist who instead hits Gill. Ruth accompanies the group to hospital. A priest, Father Murray, flirts with a cleaner, Christine, who badly cuts her hand. Adam and Toby argue over treating Gill, who Sean realises has a dislocated pelvis. Adam and Zoe realise Sean and Jessica are married when she retrieves his watch. Mike tries to stop David seeing Rose and he reveals he was proposing to her in the letter. Ruth realises a wire from a heart operation Rose had has come loose and she needs surgery urgently but she refuses unless she can get married first. Mike convinces Murray to perform a blessing. Christine feels she has tempted Mike but he refuses to lie anymore and says he loves her. Ruth babysits Joanne's daughter Lana and throws her pills away. Guest starring Meryl Hampton as Gill Florence, Alexander Morton as Mike Florence and Jo Eastwood as Rose Florence
627	37	"Saturday Night Fever"	Christopher King	Mark Catley	10 May 2008	5.79
Maggie is unaware that Toby and Joanne are sleeping together. Charlie gives Louis a lift to a concert. Along the way, they stop to help Annie, a woman who has broken down; Charlie is oblivious to the fact she is the singer from the concert and she is impressed when he helps a service station worker having an asthma attack. Ellie lets Stacey look after their son Joey but he takes him to a park and gets drunk. Joey pricks himself on a discarded syringe and Stacey attacks Joey's teacher Alan thinking he is abducting him. Ellie refuses to let Stacey back into the house until he sobers up. Lucy, a woman who came in with stomach pains, is discovered to be pregnant but insists she hasn't had sex since her husband left her over a year ago. Her lodger Justin, who has a scarred face from saving a colleague's life in Afghanistan, admits they had sex while she was drunk and she doesn't remember. He plans to make a statement to the police but she probably won't press charges. A couple, Jonathan and Julie, offer to have sex in front of first Justin and then Curtis and Snezana with Jonathan ending up banging his head; they admit it was a half-hearted attempt to spice up their marriage. Abs encourages Ruth to connect with patients. She accuses an elderly woman, Mrs McFarlane, of being a time waster but later buys her a magazine. Guest starring Joe Beech as Joey Merrick, Ibbi Andersen as Annie War and Tim Faraday as Justin Pritchard
628	38	"When Love Came to Town"	Christopher King	Jeff Povey	17 May 2008	6.83
A sex worker, Cindy, is waiting for a client in a hotel room but loses her nerve and falls while trying to climb out a window. She asks the hospital staff to call her boyfriend Liam. Another woman, Miranda, goes to the hospital asking to be sectioned, saying she's been heartbroken since her husband left. She deliberately drives into a car containing engaged couple Eddie and Flora, who were on their way to Las Vegas. Flora dies in Resus and Eddie takes an insulin overdose but the staff revive him. Liam turns out to be Miranda's husband. On learning Cindy took work as a prostitute to try and get them a flat, he asks Miranda to take him back but instead she turns herself in to the police. A young man, Lol, comes in with a head injury. His girlfriend Sally insists he is possessed, since his accent changed after a blow to the head. Ruths and Abs realise he has foreign accent syndrome and Sally hit him to try and change him back, managing to reconcile the couple. Charlie is unhappy about Zoe and Marilyn's plans to open up a private clinic for minor injuries in the department. Toby loses his sthethoscope, which Snezana has. Adam and Jessica decide to keep their distance, then promptly kiss. Guest starring Richard O'Callaghan as Eddie Morris, Claire Vousden as Flora Denby and Susan Vidler as Cindy Abrahams
629	39	"Opposing Forces"	Edward Bennett	Jason Sutton	31 May 2008	4.15
Charlie clashes with Simon Tanner, the nurse in charge of the Minor Injuries Unit. Brothers Gary and Bob perform their wire act at a superhero convention, with Bob dressed as a superhero, but Gary drops him, although his harness saves him from serious injury. Charlie is treating him for broken ribs when Simon convinces him to use the minor injuries clinic. As a result of Noel giving him the wrong notes, Simon gives Bob medication he is allergic to. Adam discovers he actually has a ruptured spleen and he is sent for surgery. Charlie notices Gary has a tremor in his hand and suspects he has MS, but Gary refuses to look into it since the act is his and Bob's life. Ruth helps Noel reorganise the filing system to better cope with the two sets of patients. Tom, an author at the convention, is pleased that George, a fan who won a competition to meet him, is an attractive blonde woman and invites her for dinner. His assistant Sarah collapses from a peanut allergy but he refuse to accompany her to hospital. Jessica realises she deliberately caused an allergic reaction to get his attention. George visits her with flowers which she claims are from Tom but Sarah realises are from her. Sarah refuses to see Tom. Kelsey continues to message "James", unaware it is Mac. Guest starring Mark Little as Gary Forrester, Martin Crewes as Gary Forrester and Kazia Pelka as Sarah Brown This episode sees the arrival of Simon Tanner.
630	40	"Have a Go, Hero"	Edward Bennett	Martha Hillier	7 June 2008	5.89
A young man, Ian, finds his brother Steve hiding in the shed, having apparently been attacked by a vigilante mob. He has given a young girl, Beth, a broken arm by hitting her with his car so Ian takes her to hospital. The police are suspicious since Steve is facing charges for abducting a minor. Ian tells Charlie that Steve took a girl to the park without oermission and will probably end up in a mental hospital. Beth shows signs of carbon monoxide poisoning and says her nana wouldn't wake up. Maggie takes Dixie and Ian to check out her house and finds an old man and dog dead and an elderly woman in a bad way because of a leak. Zoe arranges for Maggie and Ruth to take a course. Mac messages Kelsey as James saying he'll be back in the country soon. An elderly woman, Mrs Stirling, has a leg injury but insists she also has back cancer. Simon refers her to a private clinic for a full body sca and Charlie realises the Minor Injuries Unit receives payments for referring patients. Arjan, an older man who had a fall, wants to see a doctor. He is convinced to use the MIU but, since he refuses to go private, Simon can only look him over and then send him to the back of the queue in reception. Marilyn gives Adam a bonus to look him over and arranges a pay rise for Noel to cover both units. Guest starring Orla O'Rourke as WPC Caryn Finnegan, Julia Joyce as Beth Elizabeth Grey and Ravi Aujla as Arjan Kasturi
631	41	"Is She Really Going Out With Him?"	Ian Barnes	Martin Jameson	14 June 2008	6.19
Sheila, an elderly woman with Alzheimer's, wanders into the garden of her obnoxious neighbour Terry where he is throwing a party with his son Tel and heavily pregnant teenager Amber, who turns out to be Terry's girlfriend. Terry and Amber torment her and her husband Howard starts a fight in which Terry is pushed through broken glass, Amber is badly burned after falling on a barbecue and scaffolding falls down on Howard. Amber goes into labour and gives birth to a baby girl. Terry tries to stop the hospital staff finding her notes but a social worker, Lissa, reveals Terry is a serial sex offender and the baby has to be taken into care. Maggie tries to convince Amber to look after the baby on her own but Amber headbutts her and lets the baby be taken away, choosing to stay with Terry, who she says saved her from an abusive stepfather. Jeff and Snezana find Sheila and bring her to hospital. Howard admits to Abs that he was going to leave her until she was diagnosed. He suffers a stroke that leaves him debilitated; Sheila will have to be placed in elderly care. Jeff and Dixie suspect Snezana has been stealing from the ED. Stacey turns up and Abs tries to get him into rehab. Curtis finds him collapsed in the street but he disappears before Zoe can run tests. Marilyn offers to set up an alcohol unit if Abs withdraws his opposition to the MIU, which he does. Alice finds out Mac is James but is unable to tell Kelsey. Toby invites Maggie out for dinner as a thank you but she arrives home to find him in bed with Joanne. Guest starring Keith Barron as Howard Coombes, Richard Hawley as Terry Geraghty and Alicya Eyo as Lissa Burrows
632	42	"They May Not Mean to, But They Do"	Ian Barnes	Paul Logue	28 June 2008	5.88
Jeff and Snezana find a drug addict collapsed from an overdose, who is declared dead in hospital. Jeff suspect Snezana is a drug addict and Curtis gets her blood tested in secret but it comes back clear. Joanne tells Toby that Maggie fancies him and he decides they should move out. A heavily pregnant woman, Jo, sees a young man, Kris, following her around a shopping mall. He later tries to get into her car, causing her to run over Maxine, a woman who uses a wheelchair due to rheumatoid arthritis, who had been arguing with her daughter Sally over the fact Sally had been in contact with her father. Maxine is cruel towards Sally at hospital and is later rushed to theatre with internal bleeding from overdosing on a medication cocktail. Kelsey realises Kris is the son Jo gave up for adoption twenty years ago, which Jo has to tell her husband Andrew about. Simon insists Maggie check on Kris' leg pains. She suspects DVT and orders tests to confirm it but Simon lets him walk out. He collapses outside and dies in Resus from a pulmonary embolism. The notes have been lost by Noel's new filing system and Simon produces fake ones saying Maggie dismissed it as a tendon injury. Charlie vows not to let Maggie be made a scapegoat. Mac and Alice have sent Kelsey an e-mail saying James has been killed. It is only after comforting Jo that she admits she is grieving. Guest starring Linda Armstrong as Jo Linden, Harry Morrison as Kris Kemp and Ellie Beavan as Sally Toner
633	43	"I Can Hear the Grass Grow"	Peter Nicholson	Ian Kershaw	5 July 2008	5.88
Stacey is having hallucinations from alcohol withdrawal. A father, Rizwan, is trying to leave for the airport with his teenage daughter Nazrin before his wife Trish gets home and pulls out in front of Stacey, causing a crash. Abs assumes Stacey has been drinking but Ruth realises what's really going on and the breath test comes back clear. Ellie, however, leaves without finding this out. Zoe tells Maggie there will be a coroner's inquest into Kris and she will be supervised until then. Maggie discovers evidence that Nazrin has been beaten and it transpires Trish was responsible. Toby is looking at flats for himself, Joanne and Lana. Maggie and Toby argue over Nigel, a patient with a hand injury. Nigel reveals he is an estate agent and Toby gives him money for a property but Joanne disappears, leaving a note for Toby. He then learns Nigel has conned him. Kelsey plans to go to James' funeral. Guest starring Nicole Lecky as Nazrin Malik, Holly Atkins as Trish Malik and Adam Astill as Nigel Greenway
634	44	"Salt and Sugar"	Peter Nicholson	Jason Sutton	12 July 2008	5.69
Toby has been sleeping in the on-call room since breaking up with Joanne. He latches onto Holly, a single mother he knew from medical school who came in with a broken ankle. Sean asks him to finish off the operation but he fails to align the pins properly, putting her at risk of being crippled. Ben and Briony, siblings with eating disorders and a co-dependant relationship, come in after Ben has fallen down some stairs. Ben turns out to have been taking laxatives and Adam lies to Briony that he's died to try and shock her into accepting they need help. Ben has heart problems and ends up comatose in ICU but Briony carries on purging. Adam looks after Amelia and Lucas when Sean leaves them with Jessica during a shift. Zoe sees them together and renews her affair with Sean. Kelsey and Mac spend time together helping an English teacher with terminal cancer. Kelsey goes to a funeral at the time she was told but it isn't James'. Mac admits the truth and Kelsey realises Alice knew, having a go at her in front of their friends at a party before copping off with a stranger. Guest starring Rebecca Calder as Briony Grove, Gregor Henderson-Begg as Ben Grove and Louisa Clein as Holly Spellman
635	45	"Paradise Lost"	Simon Massey	Ellen Taylor	19 July 2008	6.04
Sean and Jessica are having liaisons with Zoe and Adam respectively and miss a call from the childminder saying she can't pick up Lucas from school. Lucas walks off with a Serbian girl, Natasa, and is hit on a pelican crossing by a car which ignored a red light. The driver, Joseph, tells the police Lucas ran out when the light was green and pressures his daughter Rachel to back him up. Snezana shields Natasa from the police; Jeff realises Natasa and her father Marko are illegal immigrants and Snezana provided her with a stolen inhaler. Lucas is found to have a brain injury. Rachel tells Charlie her mother died of breast cancer and he convinces Joseph to tell the truth. Jessica prays for Lucas to recover, promising to give up Adam. Tess assigns Kelsey and Alice to work together on Ireland, a compulsive gambler who got beaten up after winning someone's BMW. It transpires he failed to follow up on a cancer appointment and is now terminal. Alice manages to get Kelsey and Mac in the same room. Simon is interviewed by the coroner and Charlie is caught trying to get evidence from Marilyn's computer. Simon tells Marilyn the truth and she decides not to punish Charlie in the hope of keeping him on side. Guest starring Eoin McCarthy as Joseph Connor, Jessica Mann as Rachel Connor and Brendan Patricks as Graham Ireland
636	46	"The Things We Do For..."	Simon Massey	Dana Fainaru	26 July 2008	5.31
Marilyn discovers Zoe and Sean's affair and blackmails Zoe, wanting her to lie to the coroner's court that she heard Maggie give Simon the wrong instructions. Jessica is holding vigil over a recovering Lucas; Adam tells her he loves her but she says she doesn't feel the same way. Branka, a Kosovan immigrant, is working as a cleaner at a nursing home. She finds an air gun in her son Goran's bag and, during a struggle, Branka is shot in the face and Josie, a patient who has been in a coma for four years, is knocked out of bed. Josie is taken to hospital where her estranged parents Val and Tony turn up; Tony has a pregnant girlfriend, Hannah, and hasn't visited Josie in a year. Josie is found to have a bleed on the brain and Val and Tony sit with her as she dies. Jeff follows Snezana to a farm and finds her treating immigrants, including giving drugs and injections she isn't qualified for. Branka finds Goran is selling air guns to the other children and collapses, bleeding. She is rushed to hospital where it turns out the bleeding was the result of being wrongly prescribed warfarin. Branka decides she and Goran will go back to Kosovo. Snezana tells Jeff she has a twelve-year-old daughter, Maya, who lives with her grandmother and Jeff agrees to keep quiet if she stops. Toby sees Holly in a wheelchair in reception. Guest starring Marjorie Yates as Val Barnaby, Maria Pajevic Merrell as Natasa Jovanovic and Georg Nikoloff as Marko Jovanovic
637	47	"This Mess We're In – Part One"	Julie Edwards	Daisy Coulam	2 August 2008	5.96
A boy, Ben, leaves his younger sister Grace alone in the house while he tries to steal from a supermarket. He is spotted by a security guard and injured jumping off a building. The hospital staff realise he is deaf and Mac communicate with sign language, learning about Grace. It transpires their mother has disappeared and Grace is taken to a children's home. Luke's mother arranges for a journalist to shadow him as a promising young doctor but he points the man towards Ruth when he sees Holly in reception. Marko and several other immigrants are working at a quarry where the boss, Greyling, molests Mina, the wife of worker Milosch, in his office. Marko asks Snezana for another inhaler but she tells him he'll have to go to hospital. He collapses while driving a truck and crashes into a pile of debris. Jeff and Snezana climb into the unsafe cab to treat him. Simon continues to lie in the coroner's court and blame everything on Maggie, who is blasted by Kris' mother Pam. Charlie asks Zoe, Noel and Ruth to look for the missing notes. Jessica finds them and gives them to Zoe. Guest starring Georg Nikoloff as Marko Jovanovic, Danny Webb as Rob Greyson and Carol Harrison as Pam Kemp
638	48	"This Mess We're In – Part Two"	Julie Edwards	Sasha Hails	9 August 2008	6.63
Maggie is cleared at the coroners court as Zoe tells the truth about Simon's duplicate notes about the patient who Maggie was accused of killing. Maggie later decides to leave the Emergency Department, asking Charlie to come with her to travel. He declines and says he has a son to look after but it is the best invitation he has ever had. Elsewhere the paramedics are caught in a landslide at a quarry where illegal Kosovan immigrants have been working. One worker, a friend of Snezana, dies, and Maggie promises Snezana she will take the worker's daughter back to her family in Serbia. Toby and Ruth have a heart-to-heart and Ruth tells Toby to admit the medical mistake he has made to Sean. Abs is caught kissing his friend Stacey's wife. The court case is taken to the police. As the episode closes, Maggie and Charlie share a kiss. This episode sees the departure of Maggie Coldwell and Simon Tanner.
