= Casualty series 23 =

Twenty-third series of Casualty

Casualty
- Series 23
- Starring: Matt Bardock; Ivana Basic; Charles Dale; Sophia Di Martino; Michael French; Tristan Gemmill; Sam Grey; Jane Hazlegrove; Gillian Kearney; Tony Marshall; Janine Mellor; Matthew Needham; Suzanne Packer; James Redmond; Abdul Salis; Sunetra Sarker; Georgia Taylor; Derek Thompson; Ben Turner
- No. of episodes: 48

Release
- Original network: BBC One
- Original release: 13 September 2008 – 1 August 2009

Series chronology
- ← Previous; Series 22 Next → Series 24

The twenty-third series of the British medical drama television series Casualty commenced airing in the United Kingdom on BBC One on 13 September 2008 and finished on 1 August 2009.

== Cast ==
=== Main characters ===
- Matt Bardock as Jeff Collier
- Ivana Basic as Snezana Lalovic (until episode 31)
- Charles Dale as Big Mac
- Sophia Di Martino as Polly Emmerson (from episode 29)
- Michael French as Nick Jordan (episodes 3−48)
- Tristan Gemmill as Adam Trueman
- Sam Grey as Alice Chantrey
- Jane Hazlegrove as Kathleen "Dixie" Dixon
- Gillian Kearney as Jessica Harrison
- Tony Marshall as Noel Garcia
- Janine Mellor as Kelsey Phillips (until episode 31)
- Matthew Needham as Toby De Silva (until episode 19)
- Suzanne Packer as Tess Bateman
- James Redmond as John "Abs" Denham (until episode 7)
- Abdul Salis as Curtis Cooper (until episode 48)
- Sunetra Sarker as Zoe Hanna
- Georgia Taylor as Ruth Winters
- Derek Thompson as Charlie Fairhead
- Ben Turner as Jay Faldren (from episode 8)

=== Recurring characters ===
- Adrianna Bertola as Sharice Brooks (episodes 8−35)
- Tom Chadbon as Henry Williams (from episode 1)
- Richard Dillane as Sean Anderson (episodes 14−47)
- Danny Emes as Lucas Anderson
- Miffy Englefield as Amelia Anderson
- Caroline Langrishe as Marilyn Fox (until episode 11)
- Mark Letheren as Ben Harding (episodes 3−19)
- Amy Manson as Abby Evans (episodes 8−20)
- Joseph Morgan as Tony Reece (episodes 8−39)
- Andrew Newton-Lee as Stacey Merrick (until episode 4)
- Sarah-Jane Potts as Ellie Bridges (until episode 7)

=== Guest characters ===
- Susan Cookson as Maggie Coldwell (episode 31)
- Sharon Duce as Sheila Denham (episodes 3 and 6)
- Gregory Foreman as Louis Fairhead (episode 27)

== Episodes ==
No. overall	No. in series	Title	Directed by	Written by	Original release date	UK viewers (millions)
639	1	"Farmead Menace – Part One"	Keith Boak	Mark Catley	13 September 2008	5.74
On the Farmead Estate, teenager Sammy Malone is causing havoc with some fireworks, with disastrous consequences. With a film crew in tow, Jeff, Dixie and Adam arrive at the scene and start to treat an injured resident. The site soon becomes unstable as the repercussions continue. Unbeknown to any of them, the rocket has caused a fire, which in turn causes an explosion. Soon the fire is out of control. Tess decides to track down the culprit herself, which puts her life in grave danger.
640	2	"Farmead Menace – Part Two"	Keith Boak	Mark Catley	14 September 2008	5.94
The situation on the estate escalates and, after spotting Tess on some video footage, Charlie goes to look for her. Adam wants Jessica's decision.
641	3	"Interventions"	Jim Loach	Paul Logue	20 September 2008	6.07
Abs is quick to take the blame when Stacey is accused of injuring a young girl. In the midst of chaos, a familiar face arrives. Nick Jordan and Ben Harding arrive.
642	4	"Guilt Complex"	Jim Loach	Paul Logue & Paul Campbell	27 September 2008	5.83
Adam's suspicions about Nick Jordan grow, Charlie tries to persuade Abs to reconsider his decision and Zoe is left reeling by her test results.
643	5	"Face Up" (Note: See also "Facing Up" series 6, "Facing Up" series 12 & "Facing Up" series 19)	Ian Barnes	Suzie Smith	4 October 2008	6.46
It's Dixie's first day back and she tries to act normally. But the facade begins to crack as she starts taking dangerous risks in the ambulance.
644	6	"Hurt"	Jon Sen	Jeff Povey	11 October 2008	5.59
Abs is still struggling to come to terms with Stacey's death and takes out his frustration at work.
645	7	"There and Back Again"	Jon Sen	Jason Sutton	18 October 2008	6.14
Abs wakes up in a police cell – battered and bruised. In contrast, Adam finds himself in the company of a young woman. John "Abs" Denham departs
646	8	"The Evil That Men Do"	Paul Murphy	David Bowker	25 October 2008	5.72
Tess is forced to have faith in Charlie when a new nurse is appointed. Jay Faldren arrives
647	9	"The Line of Fire"	Paul Murphy	Michael Levine	1 November 2008	6.30
Dixie treats an overdose, and a dying father has a chance to make peace with his son – but he also has a score to settle.
648	10	"Impact"	Angus Jackson	Mark Cairns	8 November 2008	5.76
A road accident gives Ruth and Toby the chance to prove themselves to Jordan. Dixie discovers Jeff has split up with his wife.
649	11	"Own Personal Jesus"	Angus Jackson	Dana Fainaru	15 November 2008	5.87
Noisy building work, broken lifts and a power cut cause chaos in the unit. Marilyn Fox departs
650	12	"Reality Bites"	Will Sinclair	Martin Jameson	22 November 2008	5.33
Jordan is feeling rueful after his night of passion with Ruth. Dixie worries about what the impending TV documentary will reveal.
651	13	"A Slip In Time"	Suri Krishnamma	Sasha Hails	29 November 2008	5.15
A terrible accident forces Adam to confront his past. Meanwhile tensions simmer between Ruth and Jordan.
652	14	"Happiness"	Suri Krishnamma	Daisy Coulam	6 December 2008	5.96
When Jessica collapses at work, she admits to Tess she is pregnant. Ruth is worried Toby isn't coping after his night with Ben.
653	15	"Doing the Right Thing"	Will Sinclair	Abi Bown	13 December 2008	5.43
Sean tells the entire department that Jessica is pregnant.
654	16	"This Will Be Our Year"	Roberto Bangura	Paul Logue	20 December 2008	8.15
Toby discovers that rumours about him and Ben have reached epidemic proportions. Jessica and Sean continue to lock horns over their move, with damaging consequences.
655	17	"Took a Long Time to Come"	Roberto Bangura	Paul Logue	21 December 2008	6.53
Adam learns some shocking news and takes steps to find out the truth. Carefree Zoe is brought down to earth and Ruth contemplates the realities of Christmas alone.
656	18	"My Last Day – Part One"	Paul Murphy	Mark Catley	27 December 2008	6.38
Toby tries to make amends but is left trapped and alone in a perilous situation. Jessica is relieved when Sean appears to forgive her over her affair with Adam.
657	19	"My Last Day – Part Two"	Paul Murphy	Mark Catley	3 January 2009	6.41
Memories of past misdemeanours flood back as Toby fights for his life in the river. A train crash brings chaos to the staff at Holby, while Ruth questions her abilities. Toby De Silva departs
658	20	"Crush"	David O'Neill	Jeff Povey	10 January 2009	7.14
Zoe ignores Sharice's pleas with devastating consequences. Alex clashes with Adam after getting cold feet over his impending operation.
659	21	"No Going Back"	David O'Neill	Abby Ajayi	17 January 2009	7.00
Jordan makes a confession to Alex. Jessica receives alarming news and Zoe deals with the fallout from Abby and Finn's deaths.
660	22	"The Price of Life"	Rob Evans	Daisy Coulam	24 January 2009	7.18
When a stabbing victim is brought into A&E, it seems that Curtis knows the culprit. But his refusal to talk to the police threatens to wreck his relationship with Alice Zoe struggles to connect with Sharice following Abby's death.
661	23	"Midday Sun"	Rob Evans	Karen Laws	31 January 2009	7.33
Jordan faces a dilemma when Adam's brother, Alex, is rushed in following an overdose. Curtis struggles to reveal his feelings.
662	24	"Watershed"	Fraser MacDonald	Dana Fainaru	7 February 2009	7.36
Devastated by Alex's death, Adam sets out to prove a defiant Jordan's culpability.
663	25	"Stand by Me"	Fraser MacDonald	Suzie Smith	14 February 2009	6.22
Tess and Jordan realise Adam isn't coping well when he brings Alex's ashes into the office, and Curtis' plans for a romantic Valentine's day with Alice are thwarted by an unwelcome face.
664	26	"Blood"	Angus Jackson	Justin Young	21 February 2009	6.37
Alice tells Tess that she and Curtis are no longer an item and Big Mac foils a robbery attempt.
665	27	"Could We Be Heroes"	Angus Jackson	Jeff Povey	28 February 2009	6.84
Jordan tries to cover his condition. An apparent cash windfall leads Kelsey to triumphantly hand in her notice.
666	28	"Before a Fall"	Will Sinclair	Martin Jameson	7 March 2009	7.05
Kelsey tries to make amends with her colleagues. Meanwhile, Adam's skills are put to the test by an unstable addict's efforts to procure methadone.
667	29	"Shields"	Will Sinclair	Philip Gawthorne & Daisy Coulam	14 March 2009	6.60
Jessica receives news about her children, and Ruth realises she's become too preoccupied with work. Alice decides to fight for her man. Polly Emmerson arrives
668	30	"Lie Low"	Jon Sen	Dana Fainaru	21 March 2009	6.67
Big Mac reflects on events leading up to his arrest, and makes a decision.
669	31	"All You Need Is Love"	Roberto Bangura	Ellen Taylor & Mark Catley	28 March 2009	7.00
It's Kelsey's last shift and the gang has orqanised a surprise party for her. Zana makes an important decision. Kelsey Phillips and Snezana Lalovic depart; Maggie Coldwell returns for one episode.
670	32	"True Lies"	Roberto Bangura	Sally Tatchell	4 April 2009	7.08
Self-medication isn't helping Jordan's worsening condition, Adam deals with a challenging patient and Tess's suspicions are aroused.
671	33	"Someone to Watch Over Me"	Paul Murphy	Sasha Hails	11 April 2009	6.51
Jordan is diagnosed and throws himself into work. Zoe tries to balance work and motherhood.
672	34	"The Trap"	Paul Murphy	Lena Rae & Mark Catley	18 April 2009	6.14
Jordan plans to sacrifice Adam, Zoe makes a hard decision, and Jessica goes into labour.
673	35	"Better Drowned"	Ian Barnes	Paul Logue	25 April 2009	5.82
Adam's resignation sparks a shocking reaction, and Jessica gets an unwelcome visitor.
674	36	"The Price We Pay"	Ian Barnes	Daisy Coulam	2 May 2009	5.90
Jordan's secret is revealed, and Jessica has a shocking revelation about baby Harry.
675	37	"Hostile Takeover"	Alice Troughton	Mark Cairns	9 May 2009	6.00
Curtis and Alice's plans are thwarted, while Jordan and Adam begin their new regime.
676	38	"With This Ring"	Alice Troughton	Martin Jameson & Alice Nutter	23 May 2009	4.65
Alice's life hangs in the balance, and Curtis is determined that someone will pay. But how far will he go to get revenge.
677	39	"Who Do You Think You Are?"	Alan Grint	Jeff Povey	30 May 2009	5.11
There's friction between Jordan and Zoe, but as they get closer, what will the evening bring? Alice has a shock on her return.
678	40	"Palimpsest"	Alan Grint	Jason Sutton	6 June 2009	5.91
Jeff is forced to confront the end of his marriage. Meanwhile, Polly is thrown in at the deep end.
679	41	"Fight or Flight"	Adrian Vitoria	Fiona Evans	13 June 2009	5.28
Ruth goes out of her way to impress her potential new boss. Meanwhile, Jordan gathers the courage to reveal his secret to Zoe.
680	42	"Parent Trap"	Adrian Vitoria	Suzie Smith	20 June 2009	5.90
Jeff decides to fight for his kids. Jay teaches Ruth how to connect. Alice's wedding plans spiral out of her control.
681	43	"Not Over Til the Fat Lady Sings"	Dermot Boyd	Sasha Hails	27 June 2009	6.06
Jordan's illness gets the better of him. Meanwhile, Sean forces Jessica to make a difficult choice.
682	44	"Ask Me No Questions"	Dermot Boyd	Justin Young	4 July 2009	5.84
Ruth's web of lies begins to unravel. Jordan gets a nasty shock.
683	45	"Ashes"	Simon Massey	Martin Jameson	11 July 2009	6.32
Jordan is left reeling after some life-changing news, and faces a difficult decision.
684	46	"Great Expectations"	Simon Massey	Michael Levine	18 July 2009	5.75
After learning the truth about Jordan's suspension, Adam's professional conscience is piqued.
685	47	"No Fjords in Finland – Part One"	Will Sinclair	Paul Logue	25 July 2009	5.72
Curtis and Alice's wedding day is thrown into turmoil. A familiar face endangers Jessica and Adam's relationship. Sean Anderson departs.
686	48	"No Fjords in Finland – Part Two"	Will Sinclair	Paul Logue	1 August 2009	5.77
Chaos strikes following a coach crash, as the team pull together to deal with the casualties. Alice's wedding day falls apart as she sticks by Curtis in his hour of need. Meanwhile Jordan discreetly makes his exit. Nick Jordan departs and Curtis Cooper departs.
