= Casualty series 21 =

Twenty-first series of Casualty

Casualty
- Series 21
- Starring: Daphne Alexander; Luke Bailey; Matt Bardock; Ian Bleasdale; Georgina Bouzova; Liz Carling; Susan Cookson; Elyes Gabel; Kip Gamblin; Sam Grey; Jane Hazlegrove; Joanne King; Martina Laird; Simon MacCorkindale; Janine Mellor; Peter O'Brien; Suzanne Packer; Ben Price; James Redmond; Derek Thompson
- No. of episodes: 48

Release
- Original network: BBC One
- Original release: 23 September 2006 – 4 August 2007

Series chronology
- ← Previous; Series 20 Next → Series 22

The twenty-first series of the British medical drama television series Casualty commenced airing in the United Kingdom on BBC One on 23 September 2006 and finished on 4 August 2007.

== Production ==
Jane Dauncey continues as series producer for this series until Episode 21 where Oliver Kent takes over.

Series 21 marks the twentieth anniversary of Casualty with this series consisting of 48 episodes. To celebrate the anniversary, the two-part opening episode "Different Worlds" features several characters traveling to Cambodia to assist at a medical clinic, where long-standing figures Charlie (Derek Thompson) and Duffy (Cathy Shipton) are reunited. Filming took place in Phnom Penh from 22 May to 8 June 2006 with cast and crew contending with intense heat and challenging conditions. Shipton later commented on the experience stating "Cambodia is a beautiful country with gracious, dignified people. I have made many good friends and we keep in touch with email."

The series features 2 further two-parter episodes, "The Sunny Side of the Street" (episodes 17 & 18) and "Combat Indicators" (episodes 27 & 28).

== Cast ==
=== Overview ===
The twenty-first series of Casualty features a cast of characters working in the emergency department of Holby City Hospital and Holby Ambulance Service. Fifteen cast members from the previous series reprise their roles in this series.

Simon MacCorkindale stars as emergency medicine consultant and clinical director Harry Harper, Susan Cookson as specialist registrar in emergency medicine Maggie Coldwell, Liz Carling plays associate specialist Selena Donovan and Elyes Gabel as senior house officer Guppy Sandhu. Derek Thompson stars as clinical nurse specialist Charlie Fairhead. Suzanne Packer continues her role as emergency nurse practitioner Tess Bateman with Georgina Bouzova, Janine Mellor and James Redmond portraying staff nurses Ellen Zitek, Kelsey Phillips and John "Abs" Denham. Ian Bleasdale stars as operational duty manager for Holby Ambulance Service Josh Griffiths. Martina Laird and Kip Gamblin continue their role as paramedics Comfort Jones and Greg Fallon. Luke Bailey stars as healthcare assistant and Tess's son Sam Bateman, Ben Price returns as corporate director Nathan Spencer and Sam Grey as receptionist and later healthcare assistant Alice Chantrey.

Multiple arrivals and departures occur this series including the return of some familiar faces. Cathy Shipton reprises her role as Lisa "Duffy" Duffin for the first two episodes set in Cambodia as part of the shows twentieth anniversary celebrations. Shipton stated "I’m thrilled to be working with Derek again. It feels as though Duffy has never been away." Jane Hazlegrove and Joanne King arrive in Episode 3 as paramedics Kathleen "Dixie" Dixon and Cyd Pyke. Gerald Kyd makes a guest return as senior house officer Sean Maddox in Episode 5 for five episodes.

Laird departs in Episode 10 commenting "I'm very lucky to have had the opportunity to work with such wonderful people and play such a great character for five years." Bouzova departs in Episode 16 after her character Ellen is killed off. Matt Bardock makes his debut as paramedic Jeff Collier in Episode 25, initially for three months until Episode 39, before returning as a regular in series 22. Daphne Alexander arrives in Episode 26 as staff nurse Nadia Talianos with Peter O'Brien joining as consultant Theo "Stitch" Lambert in Episode 38. Bailey leaves in Episode 38 with O'Brien and Carling departing at the conclusion of the series. Carling decided to quit the show because she felt like a "workhorse" and wanted change in her life following the death of a close friend.

=== Main characters ===
- Daphne Alexander as Nadia Talianos (from episode 26)
- Luke Bailey as Sam Bateman (until episode 38)
- Matt Bardock as Jeff Collier (episodes 24−39)
- Ian Bleasdale as Josh Griffiths (until episode 17, from episode 36)
- Georgina Bouzova as Ellen Zitek (until episode 16)
- Liz Carling as Selena Donovan (until episode 48)
- Susan Cookson as Maggie Coldwell
- Elyes Gabel as Guppy Sandhu
- Kip Gamblin as Greg Fallon
- Sam Grey as Alice Chantrey
- Jane Hazlegrove as Kathleen "Dixie" Dixon (from episode 3)
- Joanne King as Cyd Pyke (from episode 3)
- Martina Laird as Comfort Jones (until episode 10)
- Simon MacCorkindale as Harry Harper (until episode 25, from episode 47)
- Janine Mellor as Kelsey Phillips
- Peter O'Brien as Theo "Stitch" Lambert (episodes 31−48)
- Suzanne Packer as Tess Bateman
- Ben Price as Nathan Spencer
- James Redmond as John "Abs" Denham
- Derek Thompson as Charlie Fairhead

=== Recurring and guest characters ===
- Holly Aird as Laura Merriman (episodes 13−16)
- Elizabeth Bell as Peggy Spencer (episode 19)
- Alice Bird as Maria Harwood (episodes 42−43)
- Charlie Brooks as Sally Montgomery (episode 5)
- Tony Caunter as Tom Stopes (episode 3)
- George Costigan as Stephen Gregory MP (episodes 13−14)
- Angus Deayton as himself (episode 29)
- Jack Dedman as Louis Fairhead (episodes 12−16)
- David Firth as Richard Bardon (episodes 6−40)
- Brenda Fricker as Megan Roach (episode 29)
- Frank Grimes as Jim McConvey (episodes 30−31)
- Romy Irving as Rosie Merriman (episodes 13−16)
- Gary Kemp as Matthew Merriman (episode 16)
- Gerald Kyd as Sean Maddox (episodes 5−10)
- Stella Madden as Nora McConvey (episodes 30−31)
- Neil McDermott as Ben Harold (episodes 9 and 13)
- Stephen McGann as Sam Roach (episode 29)
- James Midgley as Liam York (episodes 30−31)
- Scott Mills as Paul Lang (episode 11)
- Georgia Moffett as Elaine Walker (episode 34)
- Jacqueline Pearce as Elspeth Lang (episodes 10 and 12)
- Pauline Quirke as Jackie (episode 12)
- Cathy Shipton as Lisa "Duffy" Duffin (episodes 1−2)
- Julia St John as Sarah Evans (episode 16)

== Episodes ==
No. overall	No. in series	Title	Directed by	Written by	Original release date	UK viewers (millions)
543	1	"Different Worlds – Part One"	Patrick Lau	Ann Marie Di Mambro	23 September 2006	6.54
Charlie, Comfort, Abs and Guppy are in Cambodia, where Duffy has set up a clinic with her new boyfriend Mike, a former surgeon. Somnang, a doctor whose sister works at the clinic, has gone to Holby on an exchange. A man, Thomas, is brought in by his neighbour Liz. It transpires he has a gastric band that has burst, but has Liz sent away before she can find out. A teenager, Kevin, takes an overdose of prescription medication so his ex-girlfriend Jade will have to take him to hospital. The group in Cambodia meet a young woman, Voleak, who was infected with HIV and is worried of being shamed. She thinks they can cure her but they are distracted when Chad, a boy who had hassled Abs and Guppy earlier, falls out of a tree. Charlie is suspicious of Mike when he refuses to help. Harry directs Guppy over the phone to drill a burr hole, but Kevin dies while he is on the phone. Harry is furious when Somnang suggests it was Kevin's time. Voleak wanders off, suicidal. Social worker Maria is looking after a boy named Jason, whose mother Grace turned up drunk at the hospital earlier. Jason is sent on the school business, drive by Liz who is still distracted about Tommy. She drives through a red light at roadworks and causes a crash that overturns the bus. Guest starring John Bowe, Denise Black and Moya Brady This episode sees the return of Lisa 'Duffy' Duffin.
544	2	"Different Worlds – Part Two"	Patrick Lau	Ann Marie Di Mambro	24 September 2006	6.70
Charlie, Duffy and Comfort stop Voleak from committing suicide and return her to her family. Abs and Comfort later deliver a baby for Voleak's sister Keng in a remote spot, but Keng dies from a heart condition. Comfort consider adopting the baby but agrees to let Voleak look after her. Josh and Greg call for help with the bus crash and Maggie convinces Harry to let Somnang accompany her. The only serious injuries are Jason, Liz and a girl named Claire. Liz tries to blame Jason for the crash but after Kelsey sets her up with Tommy, who is widowed, she admits the truth, even though it will mean losing her job. Grace knocks Maria down a flight of stairs and steals her purse. Jason reports her to the police and she is arrested. Harry ignores Somnang's suggestion Claire was injured in the back until he shows him mobile phone footage showing she fell on a passenger's knitting needle. Somnang reveals his father was a doctor executed by the Khmer Rouge. Selena asks Nathan about his HIV and learns he was never tested. Charlie calls Sam about Mike and learns he was struck off in 1995. Mike has a stroke, having previously been left unable to operate by ischemic attacks. He and Duffy tell Charlie and Guppy that he helped his mother die when she had Alzheimer's and then turned himself in: He fled the UK after serving four years of his sentence. Charlie and the others arrange for him to go to hospital in Bangkok, promising to look after the clinic in his absence. Charlie tells Duffy he has feelings for Maggie, unaware she is kissing Somnang. Guest starring John Bowe, Denise Black and Moya Brady This episode sees the departure of Lisa 'Duffy' Duffin.
545	3	"Waste of Space"	Shani S. Grewal	Robin Mukherjee	30 September 2006	5.81
Paramedics Dixie and Cyd have been transferred from another station as part of an amalgamation. A teenage girl with cystic fibrosis, whose mother died of the condition and who lives with her grandparents, takes part in a cage fight. She loses but attacks her opponent afterwards and is impaled on a hook. Dixie and Cyd have to call Maggie to give her morphine. Josh tells them ambulances have been authorised to carry morphine but is worried they don't feel like part of the team so decides to split them up. Selena convinces Nathan to have an HIV test which comes back negative; afterwards, they kiss. Kelsey is annoyed that Ellen has replaced their flat's coffee with decaf so tries to pay her back by spiking a drink with caffeine, only for it to be drunk by Alice, who has an allergy. Alice learns Kelsey never slept with Guppy. A police officer is hit with a cricket bat while pursuing a suspect. Tess learns he is having anxiety attacks and lets him stay in the hospital. A GP, Mark, visits Gemma, an alcoholic with a chronic liver condition. Soon after, her family rush her into hospital. Harry finds signs she gave herself a fatal overdose but her daughter Sheena says she couldn't have injected herself at that point. Mark's receptionist, Jane, tells Harry a number of patients have died after he visited them. Harry tricks Mark into admitting he thinks some patients don't deserve to live and he is arrested for murder. Guest starring Stephen Moyer, Steve Garti and Tony Caunter This episode sees the arrival of Cynthia 'Cyd' Pyke and Kathleen 'Dixie' Dixon.
546	4	"Heads Together"	Rhys Powys	Joy Wilkinson	1 October 2006	6.57
Nathan makes both Harry and Selena clinical lead, having them share the job. Josh insists on sticking with his rota, partnering himself with Dixie. Kelsey is still frustrated at the idea of giving up smoking but changes her mind when she meets a patient who has kept smoking despite having a tracheotomy. A woman, Wendy, whose sister Karenis having a baby for her as a surrogate, worries she won't be a good mother. The two are involved in a car crash, resulting in Karen needing a caesarean. Wendy gets over her fears by looking after her nephew. A man falls from scaffolding after getting drunk at work. He is found by a teenage vandal and Alice gets to the truth of the matter. Guest starring Lucinda Raikes, Abigail Thaw and Daniel Anthony
547	5	"Sons and Lovers"	Emma Bodger	Matthew Evans	14 October 2006	7.45
Sean Maddox is returning to Holby as a locum registrar and stumbles across a young mother in the street whose baby has stopped breathing. He takes charge when Comfort and Greg turn up but the baby is unable to be revived. Evidence suggests he was suffocated and Charlie realises the boy's older brother accidentally smothered him with a teddy while comforting him. The boy is temporarily taken away by social services pending a police investigation. A phone call reveals Sean and Tina have broken up and she is bringing up their daughter with her new partner. A teenage girl helps her gay friend prepare for his blind date. He meets the man at a night club, where the bouncer realises he isn't eighteen and tries to throw him out, causing him to fall through a glass table. He tries to spin tales but it transpires he is only fourteen. His date leaves disgusted on finding out, and when he turns on his friend, she makes sure his mother knows what happened. Selena puts the staff's backs up by initiating a new drugs regime that sees Sam running back and forth to the pharmacy and refusing to let Guppy having time off for a course. Charlie considers asking Maggie out but changes his mind on learning of her fling with Somnang. Guest starring Charlie Brooks, Haydon Downing and Rebecca Ryan This episode sees the return of Sean Maddox.
548	6	"Angels and Demons"	Chris Lovett	Stephen McAteer	21 October 2006	6.54
A boy, Georges, is run over by a car after collapsing into the road. A pastor, Gabriel, is looking after him. Comfort and Dixie pull the car driver, Kenny, from his burning vehicle and Comfort gets vodka spilt over her. Marta, an HCA at the hospital, reluctantly leaves her young niece, Therese, with two me. Comfort and Dixie are called to the scene and find the men fleeing and Therese with a burnt hand. Comfort suspects she is being abused but Sean, thinking she has been drinking, ignores her. Kenny denies having vodka in his car so Comfort has to have a blood test. He eventually admits he was drinking on learning he will lose his legs. Georges has diabetes, which has gone untreated. Gabriel takes Therese away. Marta explains Gabriel thinks Therese made Georges ill and wants to exorcise her. Sean and Comfort stop him setting her alight and he and his followers are arrested. A wheelchair-using man with MS wants drugs to protect him from HIV after having unprotected sex with a one-night stand. Kelsey refuses since he isn't a high risk. Nathan tries to steal the drugs from him to avoid a scene and inadvertently tips off his girlfriend, who he has been reluctant to be intimate with since she became his carer. Kelsey and Alice get in trouble with Tess after their attempts to match the letters of patients with their conditions result in notes being defaced. Nathan meets with Richard and tells the staff either they or the ED at St James will be closed down. Guest starring Leo Wringer, Tim Treloar and Laura Howard
549	7	"What You See Is What You Get"	Sharon Miller	Rachel Flowerday	28 October 2006	7.33
Nathan brings in two health visitors, Max and Dan, who Tess gives a tour of the department. A stuttering farmer, Joe, has a clash with sisters Mickie and Susie who are looking for their dog on his land. After his own elderly dog dies, he accidentally shoots Mickie in the leg while firing at a fox. Maggie has just learned of Selena's relationship with Nathan and accuses her of getting preferential treatment. They argue while treating Mickie but a palm reading session by Kelsey reveals she has Addison's disease. Joe offers to look after her dog until she recovers. A young man, Andy, comes in with an injured finger. His girlfriend Lucy accepts a lift from a man named Robin but runs off when he knows her name. It transpires he is Andy's ex-boyfriend. Andy hits him and gives him a head injury, ultimately being rejected by both Lucy and Robin. Kelsey accidentally starts a fire in the toilet while smoking. Sean takes Comfort for a picnic. There is a succession of disasters as Comfort breaks a heel, a dog eats most of the food and they get locked out of thecar in the middle of nowhere, but they share a kiss anyway. Guest starring Robert Vernon, Rebecca Santos and Paul Bazely
550	8	"Born to be Wild"	Darcia Martin	Peter Mills	4 November 2006	6.52
Charlie is accompanying Josh in the ambulance for refresher training. They treat an ageing biker who collapsed in the street and later dies in hospital. Josh is being given an award for 20 years service but Dixie thinks he should refuse it as a protest against the way the service treats them. The biker's son and friends are laying a wreath for him in the street when an impatient van driver ploughs into them, badly injuring one of them. Charlie and Josh again help out. A teenage boy with mentally disabled parents gets into a fight. He tells Selena he wants to be put in care but Abs lets a charity volunteer take them away. He later learns the charity doesn't exist and the man is on the sex offenders register. He once again tries to get overly friendly with the boy, who douses him in petrol and sets him alight, killing him. Selena insists social services need to investigate the boy's situation. A disabled woman is told she's being moved to a care home in Milton Keynes and deliberately neglects to take her medication so she is hospitalised. Maggie gets her and her husband talking. Sean tells Comfort he hasn't seen is daughter in six months and is thinking of moving back to Australia to be close to her; she agrees he should go. Guppy tries to ask Cyd out and Kelsey convinces Alice to make up a boyfriend to make him jealous; this backfires on them both as Guppy nervously turns the date into group drinks and invites Alice and her boyfriend along. Charlie not only convinces Josh to accept the award but the rest of the staff to attend the ceremony. The bikers also turn up and give Josh the dead man's motorbike as a thank you. Guest starring Charlie Sheen, Jo Eastwood and Kelly George
551	9	"To Be a Parent"	Jill Robertson	Nazrin Choudhury	11 November 2006	6.82
Selena runs a dummy major incident against Tess' advice, and a lack of clear instructions leads to Maggie and Abs being called in on their day off and Kelsey asking wards to make room for non-existent patients. A factory strike over production being moved abroad and veteran worker George being sacked leads to friction between George's son Mark and David after Mark breaks the strike. A platform workers are standing on collapses on the strikers, leaving both Mark and David injured: David needs surgery on his arm and Mark might be paralysed. George admits he has Parkinsons. A policewoman accidentally pepper sprays her teenage daughter, who has been hiding in the loft with her sister's help after apparently running away from home. It turns out she has also accidentally swallowed rat poison and the mother agrees to give her daughters more attention. Charlie and Tess get Sean and Comfort talking but Comfort refuses to go to Australia with him. Guppy presses ahead with his pretend birthday drinks. On learning Alice is expected to take a boyfriend, Sam sets her up with porter Ben and they get on. Harry gives Guppy a present even though the staff have realised the truth. Nathan interrupts the gathering to reveal Holby ED will be closed. Guest starring Eamon Boland, Julian Kay and Jason Pitt
552	10	"It's Now or Never"	Ben Morris	Gregory Evans	18 November 2006	7.17
A lorry driver, Joey, thinks he is bringing contraband cigarettes into the country but has actually been given a cargo of illegal immigrants. He and Sean, who was about to get on the boat, hear the banging and free them. One of the men has a septic leg and later dies in hospital. On learning the refugees all have family in the country they can go to, Joey arranges with Sean and Comfort to smuggle most of them out of the hospital away from the police. Agnes, one of a pair of cleaning ladies, collapses from an ulcer caused by a painkiller addiction. This prompts her and the other lady Matty to admit they're in love. Agnes' daughter Charlotte threatens to cut her out of her grandchildren's lives if she pursues the relationship but Agnes refuses to back down. A traffic warden finds an Elvis impersonator collapsed in his car and calls an ambulance. The car owner then headbutts him after mistakenly thinking he was hiving him a ticket, when in fact he was leaving a note explaining the situation. Trust representative Elspeth offers Harry the position of head of the new ED if he doesn't oppose the merger. He initially refuse but later agrees to talk it over with his family. Josh convinces Comfort to take a chance with Sean and she leaves with him. Guest starring Ian Rose, Isla Blair and Bridget Hudson This episode sees the departure of Comfort Jones and Sean Maddox.
553	11	"All Through the Night"	Ian Barnes	Gary Parker	25 November 2006	6.61
Police officers Oz and Nowell finish their shift, handing over to probationary constable Nickie and her older partner Stan. A group of the off-duty officers go to a strip club.Oz is persuaded to join dancer Gina on stage; she pushes him onto broken glass, causing a melee. Oz and Gina are put in adjacent cubicles at the hospital; he explains he joined the force because his uncle was a police officer but doesn't really get on with his colleagues. He steps in when Nowell tries to threaten Gina into keeping quiet about the incident. Nickie and Stan spot a teenager, Wayne, breaking an ASBO and give chase, unaware his girlfriend Debs is nearby. Nickie hits Wayne, causing him to fall down some stairs. Debs attacks Stan outside the hospital and Nickie arrests her, intending to also confess to using excessive force. Josh is self-conscious about needing glasses, especially when he makes a mistake with medication. A couple with a newborn baby come in; the father has accidentally burnt his arm. The staff look after the baby so they can rest and Selena and Tess realise the baby broke her collarbone during birth. Nathan prepares a press conference to discuss the department closure but Ellen convinces Alice and Kelsey to join her in jumping in a fountain as a publicity stunt. Harry, who had been considering applying to the new ED, commits himself to the department. Guest starring Jessica Brooks, Charles Lawson and Laila Rouass
554	12	"No Place Like..."	Emma Bodger	Jo O'Keefe and Ann Marie Di Mambro	2 December 2006	7.11
A homeless woman, Jackie, is brought into the department and found to have gangrene but leaves without treatment. A homeless girl, Shauna, goes over to see her father Frank, who runs a café, and asks her to come home but he isn't convinced she's clean: She previously stole her sister's savings. A worker at the café, Kath, is treated by Guppy and Abs for a chest infection but can't afford to take time off. Shauna and her friend Annie take drugs, steal a car and crash it into the café, slightly injuring Frank and Kath and trapping Jackie and a boy, Justin. Charlie and Maggie are called to the scene and need to amputate Jackie's leg but she dies during the procedure. Kath's co-worker Paul learns how bad her living situation is and agrees to look after her son Zac while she is treated for pneumonia. Frank agrees to support Shauna after Annie speaks up for her. Nathan gives a radio interview about the closure plan but Harry and Tess are unimpressed. Nathan goes to Elspeth and accepts a job at the new ED. Charlie is planning to take Maggie out but Louis argues with Josh then trips and falls. He claims Josh hit him and Charlie throws Josh out. Guest starring Pauline Quirke, Tim Dantay and Sophia Di Martino
555	13	"The Edge of Fear"	Shani S. Grewal	Chris Boiling	9 December 2006	7.16
A man, Martin, takes his disabled teenage daughter, Megan, into work with him. Megan knocks over a lamp during a tantrum and starts a fire in a shed; Martin is injured going back for her wheelchair. At the hospital, it is discovered he has been handling radioactive material and several staff are quarantined with him until they are cleared. Martin probably only has a few days to live. Megan, left disabled by a tumour on her spine expected to kill her, resolves to look after herself. During preparations for a pantomime, stage assistant Angie gives actress Nikki a hard time; Nikki is dating Angie's brother Ryan, who is the director. Pushy mum Laura has brought her daughter Rosie along. Staging collapses and Nikki is knocked into the orchestra pit. Against Josh's wishes, Dixie calls a second unit for Rosie, who Laura insists has a stomach bug, but Harry finds she has simply been given too many energy drinks. Nikki finds out she is pregnant and Angie lies that Ryan isn't interested. In fact, the pregnancy is ectopic and Ryan tells Angie he wants nothing more to do with her. Ben arranges a date with Alice; Sam tries to sabotage it by claiming Ben is still in quarantine, leading Kelsey to realise he likes her himself. Selena is due to face local MP Stephen Gregory in a radio debate but Nathan tells her the department is doomed and it would be career suicide to support it. Harry takes her place and demolishes Stephen's arguments. Guest starring Joe McGann, Emma Fildes and Savannah Stevenson
556	14	"In Good Faith"	Brett Fallis	Ming Ho	16 December 2006	7.83
Stephen attends the opening of a new health centre and is bothered by a demonstration led by Ellen and Sam. Afterwards, he meets with a constituent, Dennis, who he failed to get a flat. Dennis cuts himself in front of him, and Stephen falls down stairs while trying to stop him. At the hospital, Harry learns Stephen has heart problems from taking too many indigestion tablets. Nathan has a journalist, Janice, go undercover as an agency nurse to dig up dirt on the hospital. She hampers Charlie talking Dennis off throwing himself from the roof and is exposed but Nathan avoids being associated with her. Stephen decides to stand down to spend more time with his family and he and his wife offer Dennis the use of a flat they own. Stephen later dies of a heart attack. A surfer is brought in by his girlfriend after having blackouts; it transpires he has epilepsy. Abs accuses his girlfriend of only being with him for the prestige. She convinces her boyfriend to retire from the pro circuit and run a surf school, then gives Abs some hash as a present, leaving him and Greg to have to talk their way out of trouble with Tess. Kelsey has been given a final demand and claims she needs £200 to fix her boiler; Maggie lends her the money. Josh spends the day being short with his staff and fails to make things up with Charlie. Guest starring Kevin Doyle, Alison Pargeter and Kate Alderton
557	15	"Killing Me Softly"	Diarmuid Lawrence	Barbara Machin	23 December 2006	7.85
The events are told three times from the perspective of Josh, Ellen and Laura. Josh is living alone in a flat. He and Dixie bring in Robbie and his girlfriend Merlene, who crashed their car while she was in labour. He later helps a mother, Marsha, who went into a frozen lake trying to retrieve her dog; her son Ashley later admits he let the dog off the lead on purpose. Ellen has an MRI scan but has to go to work without getting the results. The staff help a man dressed as an elf who collapsed in reception and thinks he is dying. Laura returns with Rosie, who she has coached on what to say. Josh doesn't think she is really ill, but she later has a seizure, in fact deliberately caused by Laura. Laura says Rosie's father is dead but Rosie gets a call from him. Merlene won't let Robbie see her, since she was about to leave him. He asks Ellen to ask Merlene for another chance but she fails to pass the message on. Robbie steals the baby; Ellen talks him into handing the child over but he then throws himself out an upper floor window. Laura destroys Rosie's notes, trashes the staff room and runs off with her daughter. Josh tries to stop her but she stabs him in the neck and leaves him bleeding in the back of an ambulance. Guest starring Maggie Lloyd-Williams, Fraser Ayres and Bradley Goff
558	16	"Silent Night" (Note: See also "Silent Night" series 7)	Diarmuid Lawrence	Barbara Machin	24 December 2006	7.87
Robbie is rushed into Resus. Ellen does a tox screen which shows he hasn't taken drugs recently. Merlene and several other patients are transferred to wards: It is reported Marsha is going to be fine. Maggie and Ellen realise Rosie is going into a diabetic coma and Laura injected her with insulin. Charlie calls her father Matthew. Nathan finds Josh bleeding in the ambulance and reluctantly stems the bleed while calling for help. The staff face a mammoth session to stabilise him, since he has two injuries to his heart in addition to the neck wound. Ellen finds Laura trying and failing to revive Rosie with glucose shots. Laura runs off with Rosie and Ellen is hit by a motorbike while chasing them, dying in Resus. Matthew and the police find Laura and Rosie; Rosie is revived and Laura is arrested and taken into custody. On hearing of Josh's condition, Louis admits to Charlie that he lied about Josh hitting him. Guest starring Gary Kemp, Maggie Lloyd-Williams and Fraser Ayres This episode sees the death of Ellen Zitek.
559	17	"The Sunny Side of the Street – Part One"	Rob MacGillivray	Gaby Chiappe	30 December 2006	8.29
Most of the staff gather for Ellen's funeral. Josh, who has been signed off work for six months, launches a bitter tirade at Harry. Charlie suggests he use the time off to do a tour of international cricket matches. Greg and Cyd find an abandoned baby in their ambulance. A group of protestors, including Jordi, who has a very black and white morality, and elderly couple Victor and Violet, complain to a political candidate, Sarah, about a "massage parlour" that is a front for a brothel. Jordi drags one of the prostitutes, Nessa, out into the road, causing a prison van to crash. Violet gets glass in her eye and, while the staff are treating her, Victor dies. One of the prisoners, Billy, has injuries from a concealed razor blade which he suspects another prisoner, Tyrell, has taken. Kelsey talks to Lynn, one of the injured, about her financial situation and is offered work at the brothel. Tess and Maggie realise Nessa is the baby's mother: She has passed on her heroin addiction and also has gonorrhea. Maggie tells Jordi the sex workers are victims of exploitation, so he goes back to the brothel and sets fire to it with the madam and two punters trapped inside. Guest starring Ricci Harnett, Harry Towb, Gudrun Ure and Clive Russell
560	18	"The Sunny Side of the Street – Part Two"	Rob MacGillivray	Gaby Chiappe	31 December 2006	5.83
Guppy and Abs go to help out at the fire. One punter, Vincent, is injured falling from the building. Guppy is tapped inside while helping another punter, George. Jordi tries to stop him treating him. Guppy and George are rescued but Jordi is killed when the building collapses. Charlie tries to counsel Harry over Ellen's death. Harry finds Nessa in a suicidal state, having nail-gunned her hand to some scaffolding, and talks her down. Guppy asks Alice out. Tyrell cuts Billy's hand with the blade but later hangs himself in his cubicle. Sarah is treated for cut hands and Harry decides to run for parliament in the bi-election. Guest starring Cassandra Compton, Steven Wickham, Josette Simon and Clive Russell
561	19	"Fish Out of Water"	Henry Foster	Tom Lisle	6 January 2007	7.77
Greg takes Abs, Guppy, Alice and Cyd on a surfing trip to the coast, where Guppy injures himself stepping on a spine fish. Restaurant owners Paul and Nancy are trying to get an alcoholic tycoon, Michael, to invest in them. Paul convinces fisherman Laurie to take him and Michael out, leaving Michael's son Ellis to check crab pots with Laurie's son Jason. Michael drunkenly fires off a flare pistol, knocking himself overboard, burning Paul's hands and hitting Laurie in the leg. Abs takes the group to meet up with a helicopter while Greg and Cyd rescue Jason and Ellis, who have become trapped on a rock. Greg backs off from a kiss with Cyd. Michael offers Paul money in exchange for saying Laurie set off the flare because he fell in, but after a chat with Kelsey and learning Laurie might lose his leg, Paul insists on telling the truth. Nathan is concerned by Harry's plan to run for parliament and tries to talk Selena out of supporting him. Nathan's mum Peggy learns she has had the wrong kitchen delivered for the third time, so locks delivery man Tony in a bedroom until his employers agree to correct it. Tony collapses from a combination of late onset diabetes and accidentally drinking anti-freeze but Harry defends Peggy, saying it was better he collapse there than while driving. Peggy gives Harry her support and warns Selena not to trust Nathan. Nathan proposes to Selena. Guest starring Richard Lumsden, Nicholas Ball and Jamie Jarvis
562	20	"Stormy Weather"	Ken Grieve	Sian Evans	13 January 2007	7.22
A woman, Sara, tries to convince her two young sons, Rory and Niall, to mark the fourth anniversary of their father, a journalist, disappearing in Iraq. They go for a walk with a family friend, Geoff, who Sara feels guilty about sleeping with. During a storm, Rory, who has been showing suicidal tendencies, makes no effort to get out of the way of a falling tree. Niall pushes him out of the way and is trapped. At the hospital, Harry, Selena and Tess treat him for compartment syndrome. Geoff finds Rory on a cliff edge: They both think his father is probably dead and Rory is distressed by Sara's constant insistence that he isn't. Sara agrees to accept the probability. A young agoraphobic man is left trapped in his caravan when the storm overturns it. His mother calls Greg and Cyd, with Cyd climbing inside to coax him into coming out of gas fumes. Dixie is in temporary charge of the station but both she and Greg have applied to cover Josh's six month leave. A woman is brought in by her niece, who she insists is an imposter poisoning her. Maggie realises she has Capgras Syndrome, where someone fails to recognise a friend or loved one. Nathan is frustrated that Selena hasn't given an answer to his proposal and ends up having Alice's plants dumped. He sees her pull away from Harry when he tries to comfort her. Kelsey is not only facing trouble from her landlord but also owes money to Maggie and Sam. She finds her belongings dumped outside the flat and calls Lynne, saying she needs to earn money quickly. Guest starring Ben Porter, Karen Drury and Leagh Conwell
563	21	"The Personal Touch"	Jill Robertson	Ann Marie Di Mambro	20 January 2007	7.85
A uni professor, Rachel, speaks briefly with a medical student, Marcus. She is later mugged, with an old lady being knocked over at the same time. The old lady harasses Guppy, Sam and Greg before Tess realises there is nothing wrong with her and sends her home. Marcus gives a tour to a group of schoolchildren, one of whom, Che, collapses. Marcus accompanies him to hospital and sees Rachel there. Abs finds Che has a recurrence of lymphoma which he has hidden from his father: The cancer is now too aggressive to be treated. Marcus runs into Rachel's old boyfriend Philip, who tells her he has changed his mind about having children. Kelsey lets slip to him that she is already pregnant: Marcus acted as a sperm donor. She tells both men she will contact them if she needs help. Nathan tells Alice that Harry dumped her plants and has sexually harassed a number of young women who were too scared to speak out. He tells Selena the same thing. Alice makes a formal complaint and Nathan tells Harry if he doesn't take leave it will become public. Hary tells the staff he is taking time off to campaign. Kelsey arranges to see a client at the brothel only to find it's Nathan. Guest starring Lysette Anthony, Steven Hartley and Robert Hall
564	22	"Countdown"	Illy	Peter Mills	27 January 2007	7.54
Kelsey demands £3000 from Nathan to keep quiet about their encounter. He complies in return for her signing a confession. He tells the staff that Harry has been accused of sexual harassment but most of them don't believe it. To stop them speculating, Alice admits it was her and only Sam supports her. Dixie gets the duty officer's job, immediately reassigning Cyd to work with her and criticising Greg. A headmaster, Peter, breaks up a fight between two mothers, one of whom, Donna, ends up in hospital. He has a stroke and his deputy, Margaret, who is obsessed with him, pretends to be his wife and stops Selena giving him treatment that would make him come round. Margaret tells Donna that Peter's family are away. Her husband Mickey goes to rob their house but finds them at home and is attacked by their dog. A wheelchair-using teenager, Alec, has his wheelchair stolen by bully Darren. His father Norman gets him to use a more primitive wheelchair, which results in him hitting a kerb and falling over. Donna and Abs convince Norman not to be so hard on him. Darren turns out to be Donna's son and flees from the police while Mickey is arrested. Selena throws Margaret out of the hospital after Peter's family turn up and she dies after stepping out in front of a lorry. Selena accepts Nathan's proposal. Guest starring Susie Trayling, Robin Kermode and Richard Sargent
565	23	"The Silence of Friends"	Rupert Such	Jason Sutton	3 February 2007	6.62
A young girl is upset to hear her foster parents planning to adopt her since she is hoping to go back to her birth parents. Her foster father accidentally fractures her wrist pulling her out of hiding. She calls her birth parents to the hospital: They were accused of abusing her but have always insisted she has brittle bone disease. Selena admits the test results are inconclusive. The girl disappears with her parents, who are expecting another child and worried it will be taken away from. Although the foster father sympathises, Selena insists on informing the police. Dixie and Cyd find an old man who has burnt himself on chip pan fat and is wearing women's clothes. He tells Abs they belong to his late wife; he started wearing them because he misses her. Dixie brings in a man who fell into an open grave while drunk and forces Tess to take him by threatening to dump him on the floor. It turns out he used alcohol as an anaesthetic while having his tongue pierced. He is aware his wife is cheating on him and gets on with the mother of one of the teenagers who found him. Harry's suspension makes the papers. A suspicious Alice checks his file and learns Nathan lied about past complaints. She interrupts a press conference Harry is holding to say she's withdrawing the complaint. Nathan tells Selena about the job offer. Kelsey tells her about meeting Nathan at the brothel. Selena gives Kelsey her engagement ring, telling her to sell it and give Nathan his money back, then breaks up with Nathan. Guest starring Michaela Megran-Handley, Richard Dillane, Andrea Lowe and Chris Gascoyne
566	24	"No Return"	Nic Phillips	Andrew Clifford	10 February 2007	8.22
It is Harry's last day of campaigning before the election. A woman, Linda, watches father and son, Dave and Mike, have a driving lesson which ends with them crashing and Dave being impaled by a pole. Linda calls an ambulance and gets help from Harry, who accompanies them to hospital. Outside, Linda is attacked by a man who throws acid at her. Kelsey learns she is actually Dave's daughter Karen, who killed a young girl when she was 16. Mike had been told she had drowned on holiday. He wants to get to know her but Dave refuses to acknowledge her. After she has gone, Harry tells Maggie she has terminal cancer. A group of teenagers sneak into a stately home and one of them suffers a minor injury during a playful sword fight. Dixie has messed up the rosters, since new paramedic Jeff doesn't arrive until the next day. She accompanies Cyd on a back-to-back shift and falls asleep at the wheel; Cyd sends her home. The teenager is discovered to have gonorrhea and is shocked to discover the girl he has been sleeping with has also slept with the other boys in their group. He had been planning to propose to her but agrees to give their open relationship philosophy a try. Alice is planning to leave but Sam talks her round by faking up a rainforest in reception and she clears the air with Harry, Tess and Guppy. Harry has been hoping for 15% of the vote to show support for the hospital, but instead wins the election with 50% of the vote: The hospital is safe and Nathan has lost his new job, but Harry now has to be an MP. Guest starring Lydia Baker, Lorraine Stanley and Philip Bird Note: Matt Bardock makes an uncredited voice-only appearance as Jeff Collier
567	25	"The Miracle on Harry's Last Shift"	Brett Fallis	Mark Catley	17 February 2007	6.96
It is Harry's last shift but he doesn't want a fuss, so Abs convinces the others that their present to him should be making sure no-one dies. A self-styled vigilante, Alan, is trying to clean up an estate. Gangster Jonty runs over an old lady, Mary, who Alan summons help for. Harry learns she was diagnosed with schizophrenia 40 years ago but slipped through the cracks, getting her sent to a psychiatric hospital. Abs learns Greg is avoiding Cyd because of a bad past relationship and gets them together by having Greg volunteer for a demonstration for testicular cancer screening. Alan punches a noisy neighbour and ties up a boy he catches dealing drugs and a group he found tormenting a dog, but is unable to bring himself to kill Jonty. Jonty's girlfriend Tracey turns up at the hospital after miscarrying him; she used to go out with Alan, but after she slept with Jonty, he considered her his property. Alan beats Jonty in a fight but Jonty stabs him in front of Dixie and Jeff. Harry is about to abandon resuscitation when his heart spontaneously restarts and Tracey accompanies him to theatre. Jonty breaks into Alan's house intending to trash it but is killed by a shotgun booby trap he left behind. Selena kisses Harry before he leaves. Guest starring Liam Boyle, Ramon Tikaram and Kenny Baker This episode sees the arrival of Jeff Collier. The full script for the episode can be read on the BBC website.
568	26	"The Killing Floor"	Craig Lines	Ann Marie Di Mambro	24 February 2007	7.32
A young man, Steve, has inherited an abattoir from his father and is planning to run it with his girlfriend Kirsty. Two militant vegetarians, brothers Lee and Frankie, get the place evacuated with smoke bombs and inject the meat with poison. Steve finds them and Le electrocutes him with a cattle prod before a carcass falls on Frankie. Lee takes him to hospital, claiming he fell of a ladder. New nurse Nadia suspects he is lying and has further injuries but Guppy and Abs just treat him for a broken arm, only for him to collapse and die from internal injuries. Kirsty is working with the brothers: On learning Lee hasn't sent out a warning, she alerts the press and also tells the police where to find and arrest them. Dixie is put out to learn Cyd is seeing Greg. A mother, Fiona, is leaving her teenaged son Marlon to care for her baby. Meanwhile, a group of abseilers have a race outside the building and one of them, Chris, accidentally knocks Fiona off her balcony. His friends claim she jumped and hit him on the way down, prompting Marlon to tell staff not to resuscitate her. A guilt-ridden Chris tells Marlon the truth but he keeps quiet about it and learns Fiona might have post-natal depression. Nathan clamps Nadia's car after she parks in his spot but has the clamp removed on learning she is the daughter of a surgeon and friends with Bardon. He also builds bridges with Alice by giving her tickets to the Chelsea Flower Show. Kelsey lets down Nadia's tyres in revenge but is annoyed when Guppy, Abs and Sam all rush to fix it. Guest starring Kerrie Taylor, Gregory Chisholm and Tom Hiddleston This episode sees the arrival of Nadia Talianos, and is notable for the guest appearance of Tom Hiddleston as Chris Vaughan.
569	27	"Combat Indicators – Part One"	Ian Barnes	Stephen McAteer	3 March 2007	7.01
Nathan has hired an army doctor, Andrea Peterson, as the replacement for Harry. She criticises Nadia for getting Guppy to do her work for her and clashes with Selena and Tess. Two college students, Joe and Bill, are taking part in a war game at a warehouse which ends with Joe falling into a skip full of broken glass. Joe causes an arterial bleed by moving and Greg and Cyd have to call out Andrea, who it is clear Greg knows. Bill learns Joe has no more friends than him and is disillusioned but eventually sits with him. Bickering married couple Mickey and Lisa come in after he stabbed him with a fork. Dixie thinks they will split up but Jeff bets her two weeks' meals they will patch things up and is proved right. A woman, Ella, as a panic attack trying to get on a plane. She has terminal lung cancer, which she has hidden from her son Lou, but promised her late husband she would conquer her fear of flying. Jeff and Lou take her back for her flight. Andrea tells Greg she has left her husband but he says he waited a year for her. She follows him back to the ambulance station where Kelsey, Dixie and Cyd catch them kissing in an ambulance. Guest starring Luanne Gordon, Tom Ellis and Junior Simpson
570	28	"Combat Indicators – Part Two"	Rob MacGillivray	Stephen McAteer	7 March 2007	4.85
A teenager, Darren, leaves his drunk father Mark alone in the house. Neighbour Roger finds an unexploded bomb while ploughing a field and goes to alert the authorities. His daughter Carla stumbles across the bomb with Darren and another youngster, Ty, and it goes off. Newsman Russell is filming a piece on rare birds in a nearby field with cameraman Derek, who suffers minor injuries. Jeff and Dixie head to the scene, followed by Greg, Cyd and Andrea. Ty is dead and Carla has spinal injuries that could leave her paralysed. A second bomb is discovered and Mark, an ex-soldier, stays with Greg and Andrea as they amputate Darren's leg to get him out before it explodes. Roger initially blames Darren but a video shows he was trying to get help while Carla goaded Ty into starting up a tractor, causing the explosion. Mark tells Andrea he let his unit kill an unarmed boy in Iraq and immediately after heard his wife had been killed in a car accident. Russell gets Kelsey's support to film a piece on the accident but quickly ditches her for Nadia. Derek walks out on him when he wants him to film Ty's parents. Greg tells Andrea things are over between them. Andrea resigns to go back to Afghanistan and Nathan is happy to let her go since Selena has been complaining. Cyd refuses to talk to Greg and leaves with Dixie. Guest starring Luanne Gordon, Damian O'Hare and Darren Evans
571	29	"Sweet Charity"	Jill Robertson	Richard Curtis & Gary Parker	10 March 2007	7.00
Abs is doing a sponsored sleep in the car park for Comic Relief while Alice has set up a swear box. Nathan is refusing to co-operate though, insisting Kelsey wear uniform, so Tess and Alice sponsor people to make daft suggestions to him. A Kurdish refugee is injured after breaking into a school and fleeing to a building site. The school's head learns he is a former headmaster who was tortured after trying to protect students who had been on a protest. She arranges for him to do volunteer work and claim asylum. An elderly woman brings in her friend whose medication she has tampered with, also poisoning the friend's son-in-law: She wanted to draw the police's attention to the fact he was hitting her, resenting her living with them. Angus Deayton comes in with a splinter and Sam blackmails him into running a slave auction. When Nathan shuts it down, Alice gives an impassioned speech about how Comic Relief helps the people they treat. Former staffmember Megan turns up after her grandson Colm is found self-harming and her son Sam is forced to admit he has schizophrenia. After a talk with her, Nathan makes a large contribution to the swear box. Guest starring Angus Deayton, Susan Jameson and Sylvia Sims This episode sees a guest appearance by Megan Roach.
572	30	"A World Elsewhere"	Dez McCarthy	Sasha Hails	17 March 2007	6.01
Nadia asks Abs to come to a concert with her and does a number of menial tasks so he can leave work early. However, he passes the ticket on to Kelsey, who passes it on to a tramp they were treating. An elderly couple argue about looking after their grandson while their daughter goes back to work. The boy falls over a railing at a shopping centre but a psychic, Sharon, catches him. The grandmother gets her hair caught in an escalator while running after him and accepts they're too old to cope. Jeff gets Sharon to choose a winning horse and it comes in. He bets big on her second tip but the horse comes last. A young woman, Kira, rings her estranged parents Jim and Nora and arranges to meet them: She has a daughter, Siobhael, that they don't know about. However, her boyfriend Liam tracks her down and pushes her off a motorway bridge, taking Siobhael. She lands on the car of a young driver, Ravi, who comforts her until the ambulance arrives. His brother Tariq chastises him for taking the car but his girlfriend Michelle is impressed by his compassion. Kira dies in Resus and Cyd is convinced she was trying to tell her something, consulting Sharon. Cyd and Nora deduce from her muttering Siobhael's name that she had a child but Jim refuses to accept it and makes a complaint against Cyd. Aware that Cyd ran away from home at sixteen and had an abortion, Dixie fails to support her. Guest starring Lisa Hogg, Nicola Duffett, John Normington and Catrin Stewart
573	31	"Stitch"	Shani S. Grewal	Gregory Evans	18 March 2007	5.66
Nathan and Richard attend a casino. Another customer, Theo "Stitch" Lambert, realises that croupier Stevie is involved in a scam and advises her to stop. She ends up being stabbed in the neck by her accomplice and Stitch, an itinerant consultant surgeon, takes charge. Selena takes a dislike to him and takes a long time to accept his diagnosis of a bronchial tear. Nathan offers Stitch a six month contract. Another casino attendee finds a young man trying to drive off in her car and he runs over her foot. She recognises him as an old student of hers that she thought she put on the right track. In fact, she did: He was actually repossessing the car and knows that she is in debt because of her gambling, offering to help her. Jim continues to object to Cyd and Nora's search and has an angina attack. Liam takes Siobhael with him to break into a house but falls onto a stuffed deer's head and is impaled, dying in Resus. Grg ad Cyd check out is adfdress but find no sign of Siobhael. Cyd is ready to give up until Jim admits Liam rang him and confirmed they had a child. Greg and Cyd find Siobhael near where Liam was injured. Nora resolves to take her and go stay with her sister. Greg and Cyd kiss. Sam is getting fed up of his job so arranges to go out with the paramedics. Gues starring Sally Bretton, Isabelle Amyes and Tom Hopper This episode sees the arrival of Stitch Lambert.
574	32	"Life's too Short"	Craig Lines	Linda Thompson	24 March 2007	6.83
Stitch begins his first shift at A&E. He relocates a dislocated shoulder without anaesthetic by hypnotising a man and chats up agency nurse Annette. Sam accompanies Greg and Jeff in collecting a cyclist collapsed on a hillside. He is a local fire chief who has taken an overdose after being diagnosed with Huntington's disease and refuses anything other than pain relief. Maggie calls his wife and Stitch performs a stomach pump without consent. Two cross-dressers go out together in their car and are ran into by two brothers who have just been drinking. The driver flees the scene but his brother has pancreatitis. Selena puts a line in without checking and causes a pneumothorax but Stitch defends her. His brother is later arrested. The wife of one of the cross-dressers turns up and tries to accept his lifestyle. Maggie goes to confront Stitch and finds him with Annette; Charlie sees her slap him. Guest starring Kevin Pallister, Bill Thomas, Wendy Morgan and Warren Brown
575	33	"Day One"	Frank W. Smith	Robin Mukherjee	31 March 2007	6.69
Tess panics that Sam didn't come home from a lads' night out but he turns up for work as normal and turns out to have had a tattoo done. Tess agrees to him moving in with Greg. Guppy asks Stitch to look at a woman who he thinks has had an allergic reaction. Stitch thinks she's a time waster but Guppy thinks it's because of her husband's pigeons. After the husband agrees to get rid of them, Stitch tells Guppy and Nadia that she faked the rash with stinging nettles so the pigeons would go...but they can't tell her husband because of patient confidentiality. Alex. who has just been released from prison, is planning to run an arcade with his friend Joe, but finds the premises has been smashed up by a rival, Yannis. An attempt to confront him turns violent and Joe is injured, later experiencing a reaction to anaesthetic which prompts Stitch to force Guppy to intubate him unaided. Alex calls a gang boss who owes him a favour, resulting in Yannis' son Michael being beaten up. Alex and Yannis call a truce, with Alex keeping quiet about the fact Joe's wife had been sleeping with Yannis so he'd stay away. A gardener falls out of a tree into a pool, with a branch coming down on top of him. He fears he has dementia but Tess reveals he actually has carbon monoxide poisoning from a faulty boiler. Stitch turns down Nadia when she makes a pass at him but later plays footsies with her during end of shift drinks. Guest starring Brendan Mackey, Ben Cartwright and Charlotte Avery
576	34	"Lost in the Rough"	Paul Murphy	Kevin Clarke & Linda Thompson	7 April 2007	6.35
Stitch ignores Nadia after spending the night with her. An elderly man collapses while playing golf with a friend and is suspected to have an intercranial bleed that will probably be fatal. Nadia is told to keep an eye on him but she meets Stitch for a liaison instead. The man gets his friend to turn off his life support and he dies: They made a bargain when they served together in World War II to put each other out of their misery if they were fatally wounded, and his friend is prepared to face charges. Stitch denies Nadia was with him. A drug addict robs a chemist where his girlfriend works but learns the drugs he has taken are useless. He convinces her to break into a house with him but she cuts her arm while trying to escape. He calls an ambulance to meet him but refuses to tell Greg and Dixie where he is unless they give him morphine. He ends up fleeing after Greg calls for back-up, but not before Dixie learns where his girlfriend is. He later tries to steal drugs from the hospital but is stopped by Dixie and taken away by Security. Greg wants to take Cyd camping; Dixie considers blocking it, then convinces him to take her on a cathedral tour instead. A boy steals a bike and crashes it into an overpass His mother tries to get him out of hospital but it turns out he has adrenoleukodystrophy, a fatal genetic nerve disorder, and his mother has hidden it from him: She is convinced to tell him the truth. Abs and Tess practise dancing. Selena finds she is pregnant and tells Maggie that it's Harry's. Guest starring Antony Carrick, Ralph Watson and Georgia Moffett
577	35	"Lush"	Nic Phillips	Ray Brooking	21 April 2007	6.57
Stitch and Guppy have a bet to see who can get through the most patients. This leads to Guppy taking a slapdash approach which sees a woman with a benign cyst thinking she has cancer. A drug addicted couple accidentally start a fire in their home, leading to them and their young son having to be rescued. Guppy gives the boy a drink from his mother's bag which turns out to contain methadone. The mother ends up walking out on the family when her husband refuses to abandon their son. A woman follows her husband to a house he is renovating, suspecting he is having an affair with the owner, and ends up putting her foot through the stairs.She tells Dixie she had cosmetic surgery that imprioved her confidence and caused her to change her lifestyle but her husband preferred her the way she was before. They part amicably. Kelsey and Alice treat a man with a nose bleed which suddenly gets worse, meaning Stitch has to tie off the arteries. A shoddy car dealer crashes one of his own vehicles. Alice worries Tess and Abs are in a relationship. Jeff realises Dixie likes Cyd and tells her he knows his wife has been cheating on him for years. Maggie convinces Selena to have an ultrasound on the quiet and they learn she is twelve weeks gone, making Nathan the father. Guest starring Paul Simpson, Kate Miles and Tracy Brabin
578	36	"Aliens"	Nigel Douglas	Tom Lisle & Jack Kelsey	28 April 2007	7.14
Josh has taken a plane back from Karachi. A young Muslim boy goes into a panic and jumps from the plane, leaving his bag behind. Josh thinks he was having a hypoglycemic attack but the police are convinced he is a terrorist, refusing to let Josh treat him or pass on his information to Jeff and Cyd. Josh accompanies his neighbour, who had chest pains, to hospital and fills in Stitch and Guppy. He tells Charlie he has resigned. A girl who was trampled in the confusion turns out to be the boy's girlfriend; they were planning to run away together but her brother was keeping an eye on her. Josh explains to the police and reunites the pair. He decides to accept a room at Maggie's and withdraw his resignation while letting Dixie stay as station chief. A woman and her children are moving in with her new boyfriend but her daughter becomes seriously ill with Weil's Disease from consuming rat droppings. The woman reluctantly calls the children's father but has no interest in getting back with him and still plans to move in once the house has been de-ratted. Alice shares her concerns about Abs and Tess with Sam. Selena tells Nathan she's pregnant but his reaction leads her to decide to have an abortion. Guest starring Sagar Radia, Ruby Visaria and David Garfield
579	37	"Close Encounters"	Ben Morris	Sian Evans & Robin Mukherjee	5 May 2007	6.59
A mother of two young boys, whose husband is away with the army, falls down the stairs after tripping on a toy. Josh answers the call on his first day back and annoys Dixie by taking charge. The mother learns she is pregnant again and tells Selena she never wanted children but refuses to get rid of the baby. Nathan looks after the boys while she is being treated. A father and his teenage daughter return home to find her ex-boyfriend, who has been stalking her, in the house. After the father drives off, he is found to have crashed into a skip nearby. The boyfriend turns up at the hospital with a cut face, saying he dived out of the way of a car, and the father admits driving at him after the boy challenged him and giving him a glancing blow. The boyfriend then collapses and dies, leaving the father to be questioned by the police. Guppy and Nadia treat Gordon Cunningham, who claims to have chemical poisoning. Charlie reveals he is a frequent time-waster and has Josh pose as a doctor to get rid of him. Sam doesn't turn up for work and Alice admits what she told him to Tess. Greg and Alice find he has taken his things but left his medication behind and the staff organise a search. Guest starring Katie Griffiths, Sean McKenzie and Ian Lavender
580	38	"A Long Way from Home"	Joss Agnew	Ann Marie Di Mambro	19 May 2007	6.42
The staff's search for Sam sees them speak to a group of homeless people sheltering under a bridge. A lorry driver parks nearby with a prostitute and wakes up late the next morning. Eager to get going, he ends up driving through the camp, slightly injuring an older man and trapping a youth he befriended. The youth is briefly believed to be Sam. On learning he was a college dropout, Abs tracks down his mother but he dies before she gets there after Stitch and Guppy choose not to resuscitate. The lorry driver faces questioning for manslaughter. A Salvation Army member, Mark, finds his friend Ken injured after a fall. The pair are having a relationship but Ken is engaged to a woman and decides to go ahead with the wedding rather than let his mother down. Dixie tells the ambulance crews that they are overstaffed with Josh's return so one of them will have to be transferred: If she doesn't get a volunteer, she will have to make a recommendation. The elderly homeless guy tells Abs that Sam is in a hostel and Abs responds by getting him his estranged son's number. Sam has replaced his medication and is intending to go travelling but is convinced to say goodbye to Tess first. Alice admits her feelings for him and they share a goodbye kiss. Guest starring William Travis, Mona Hammond and Rhashan Stone This episode sees the departure of Sam Bateman.
581	39	"The Apostate"	Rupert Such	Jason Sutton	26 May 2007	6.77
A man leaves his pregnant fiance to head out to work, shortly before a bailiff comes to repossess the car. He claims he is at Heathrow but is actually on a country lane, where he has a heart attack. It transpires he is actually a manual labourer, not the executive he pretended to be, but his fiance decides to stay with him anyway. Cyd overhears Dixie considering recommending Greg for the transfer and says she would go with him, while Dixie admits she'd leave too if Cyd went. Jeff volunteers to take the transfer. A devout woman whose husband is training to be a priest is brought in. Stitch realises she has arsenic poisoning: For years, she has been drinking holy water she bought off the internet which has caused extensive damage. An alcoholic who has been drinking petrol helps solve a burst pipe in cubicles, but later has to be rushed to Resus after another drinking bout. Nathan tries to talk Selena out of the abortion but she goes to the clinic anyway. He finds Stitch snorting cocaine in his office but Stitch retorts that if Nathan reports him, he will look foolish for hiring him. Guest starring Jo-Anne Knowles, Joe Dixon and Lee Oakes
582	40	"Communion"	Simon Massey	Neil Docking	2 June 2007	6.26
Nathan instructs a window cleaner to start work on his own, resulting in him falling from the platform and being left dangling from a rope. He needs urgent treatment because the blood supply has rushed to his legs. His father hires a personal injury claim lawyer, who was in after a trip. It does lead to a family reunion however when the father builds bridges with his pregnant daughter-in-law. A man deliberately starts a fight with some thugs and gets stabbed with his own knife. Josh and Dixie find him and Josh freezes up, but later denies it. The man reveal;s he was a Catholic member of the Royal Ulster Constabulary who betrayed his colleagues to the IRA out of fear, and now wants to die. He ends up dying in Resus after pulling out his leads. Nathan gets Stitch to resign on learning he lied about his employment history but Richard ends up offering him a pay rise to stay on. Guest starring Ian McElhinney, William Ilkley and Louise Breckon-Richards
583	41	"Brass in Pocket"	Derek Lister	Gaby Chiappe	9 June 2007	6.32
The staff are going out for drinks to celebrate Tess spending 20 years in nursing but Tess herself misses the taxis. Stitch spikes the non-alcoholic punch, getting Nathan and Cyd drunk. Nathan tells everyone Selena had an abortion, prompting her to tell everyone he uses prostitutes. He falls onto a table and Kelsey takes him to the hospital to patch him up, thanking him for not telling anyone her secret. A middle-aged man comes in believing he's in labour, saying his mother had several babies who died. Guppy discharges him but he later comes back in and Abs realises he has an aortic aneurysm. A woman whose husband has just left her throws a rock through the window of his house, injuring his girlfriend. Unaware the pair have already left for hospital, she then sets herself on fire and is discovered by Tess and Nadia. They rush her to hospital with Josh and Dixie, but Stitch and Guppy are unable to save her. Her daughter leaves the father's girlfriend when she falls and hits her head but Cyd finds her and she recovers. The father has to focus on his daughter but still wants his girlfriend in his life. Guest starring Selina Boyack, Madeleine Daly and Geoffrey Hughes
584	42	"Entropy"	Craig Lines	Sasha Hails	16 June 2007	5.13
Nathan crashes his car after Selena brakes in front of him to avoid a bag lady. A young teenage girl watches the binmen from her flat. One of them hears a baby crying in one of the bags and dives into the crusher to retrieve it; his colleague is listening to music and doesn't hear the shouts, resulting in him being partly crushed. Greg and Cyd take the baby boy to hospital while Josh and Dixie stay around as the man is cut out. He later suffers an angina attack in Resus and dies; it transpires his family that he often talked about left him years earlier. The girl comes in with bleeding and Selena realises she is the baby's mother, managing to convince the girl's neglectful mother and reunite them. Cyd tells Greg about her abortion but he is unsympathetic. Nadia is humiliated when Stitch leaves her bra in Nathan's office after another liaison. A medical student, Maria, is working as a waitress and tries it on with a chef, causing another chef to sever his finger with a cleaver. Maria collects the finger, which is eventually retrieved after the bag lady takes the box. The chef she fancied reveals he is gay. Stitch is determined to set Guppy up after learning he's a virgin and takes him to the club where Maria works; Guppy and Maria kiss. Guest starring Ellie Paskell, Emma Atkins and Andrew Dunn
585	43	"It Never Rains..."	Paul Murphy	Chris Boiling & Jason Sutton	23 June 2007	5.94
Guppy has had brief sex with Maria. A groom-to-be, Dave, has gone out for his stag night, but his fiance Sophie has invited herself along and starts a fight, which bouncers Tom and Barry are injured breaking up. Dave later falls down a storm drain and is washed away. Charlie finds evidence that Barry is self-harming and convinces him to get therapy. Dave is found by two workers, Maddox and Sexton, and Greg and Cyd summon help on finding him trapped. Stitch sends Guppy, who has to amputate three fingers to free him. Cyd is annoyed when Greg sends her away and breaks up with him. Dave strikes up a friendship with Maddox and breaks up with Sophie. An elderly man comes back from holiday. His neighbour tries to tell him she loves him but he collapses with breathing problems. Guppy thinks it is just a panic attack and wants to discharge him but Kelsey keeps him in so she can play matchmaker. He is later brought back in and turns out to have a pulmonary embolism. Stitch tells Guppy about his cocaine habit and Guppy later sneaks back into his office. Guest starring Tamer Hassan, Joe McFadden, Jodi Albert and Roy Hudd
586	44	"Lie to Me"	Nigel Douglas	Stephen McAteer	30 June 2007	6.98
Stitch realises Guppy has been raiding his cocaine stash to stay awake and view operations, warning him to cut it out. A man climbs a drain pipe and tries to attract the attention of a teenage girl. He is chased by the police and falls from a motorway bridge. It transpires he is an escaped prisoner who was convicted of murdering his wife eight years previous but maintains he is innocent and was trying to contact his daughter. Abs agrees to smuggle out a letter to her but regrets it when the girl arrives and reveals she witnessed the murder. A man who called for an ambulance sends Dixie and Cyd away embarrassed and goes to the hospital himself, where he reveals he has a mobile phone jammed in his rectum, which Maggie removes. Charlie learns Maggie and Josh are going out for dinner and warns Maggie that Josh might have feelings for her. Cyd and Dixe are called out to a property where a man and woman just returned from holiday have been bitten by a snake. Cyd is also bitten when knocking Dixie out of the way. The woman, who took most of the venom, dies in hospital and Dixie tells Cyd she loves her. She co-opts Greg to retrieve the snake so the right anti-venom can be found but Cyd is unsure how to cope with the revelation. Guest starring Steve North, Martin Troakes and Olivia Hallinan
587	45	"The Fires Within"	Paul Norton Walker	Gary Parker and Jack Kelsey	14 July 2007	5.73
A woman doing a charity parachute jump has impaled herself on a TV aerial. Charlie and Maggie struggle to get her a theatre slot so, acting on a suggestion from Stitch, she pulls the aerial out and has to be rushed into theatre as an emergency. She feels less pleased when Charlie points out patients needing urgent surgery had to wait as a result. Cyd returns to work but asks to be partnered with Greg. Maggie and Josh both worry the other has feelings for them and Josh reveals he is seeing a woman he met on holiday. A woman finds her husband has been having an affair with a colleague and gets into a fight with her, while her husband crashes his car. Negligence by Stitch leads to him suffering a reaction to penicillin. Husband and wife reconcile and it turns out his mistress lied about having cancer. A French anti-war protestor and Algerian War veteran, Claude, sets off fireworks on his balcony to mark Bastille Day. His neighbour Alan, whose son is serving in Afghanistan, objects and a struggle between the pair results in the fireworks setting fire to Claude's house and Alan falling through a shed roof. Abs gets the two men talking and Alan lets Claude stay with him while his house is fixed up. Tess pulls out of the dance competition with Abs, not wanting to perform in public, but ends up inadvertently doing the routine in the staff room while everyone's watching. Stitch spends most of the shift shut up in his office using online gambling sites but Nadia empties his account. Guest starring Clare Calbraith, Nicholas Courtney and Tracie Bennett
588	46	"Walking the Line"	David Innes Edwards	Linda Thompson and Jason Sutton	21 July 2007	6.52
A same-sex couple, Annie and Maura, have taken their foster son Ryan to the fair. Maura is the primary carer and feels Annie spoils him. Annie takes him on a ghost train but he gets scared and jumps out. Annie gets her foot caught in the rails chasing him and is hit by another car. Maura manages to talk Ryan down from scaffolding. He is scared of men, having been abused by one, so Dixie and Cyd take him in and Selena and Kelsey look after him at the hospital. Kelsey ogles a builder with a busted hand but it turns out he was after Nadia's phone number. Recovering drug addicts Corin and Lisa leave their daughter Lucy with Corin's father Tony. Lisa meets a dealer, Vince, but Corin hits him with a plank of wood. Lisa jumps out of their moving car while Corin is in a minor crash. Lisa dies from an aortic injury and Corin resolves to look after Lucy by himself. Guppy pockets and takes some heroin Vince dropped, thinking it's cocaine, and Stitch has to resuscitate him in secret. Vince tells Guppy he owes him for the drugs and gives him his card. Guest starring Gemma Lawrence, Sean Verey and Billy Geraghty
589	47	"Seize the Day"	Jim Loach	Tom Lisle	28 July 2007	6.04
Stitch avoids the hospital by joining Dixie and Cyd on a shout and helping deliver a baby. A man helps his wife into a car and later comes out to find she has gassed herself. He calls an ambulance, admitting she had a terminal brain tumour and he knew what she was doing. She dies in Resus and Stitch has a go at the husband for calling the ambulance, saying he let her down. Since she started the engine herself, the police let the husband go. Guppy later goes to check on him and finds he has hanged himself: He is pronounced dead in hospital. A woman is brought in after a car accident and her sister insists she needs plastic surgery. Harry is visiting with the health minister and helps Selena resuscitate her. Selena realises Harry tried to keep in touch and tells him she didn't go through with the abortion and is still pregnant. Guppy calls a drug dealer. Stitch calls Maggie after hours but, when she doesn't immediately realise who he is, takes more drugs. Guest starring Alex Ferns, Kathleen McDermott and Caroline Williamson
590	48	"To Love You So"	Robert Knights	Gaby Chiappe	4 August 2007	6.03
Greg and Dixie come across an elderly man who has fallen while drunk and bring him in, along with a tramp who claims to know him. Guppy has been taking cocaine to get through the shift and gives him the wrong drugs, causing him to die of heart failure. Stitch tries to cover for him, injecting the body with the right drugs, then, when the man's daughter turns up and explains he turned to drink when her mother died, takes the blame, feeling Guppy deserves another chance more than him. Harry makes his official visit with the minister and sticks around when Nathan takes the minister for lunch. Selena realises he assumed the baby was his and has to admit it's Nathan's, before confiding in Maggie about her feelings. A man has been keeping guard over his wife at night. He cuts his thumb off at work and she sees him being taken away by ambulance. He explains to Harry that his wide has paranoid delusions and distrusts authority figures like doctors: She has had a number of miscarriages while on medication, so has come off it after becoming pregnant again. His wife turns up with a gun and holds Harry hostage in the treatment room. Selena goes in to help and nearly talks her down but she is distracted by armed police and shoots Selena before being arrested. Harry and Stitch fail to save Selena but deliver the baby girl at 24 weeks. Stitch resigns after a brief farewell with Maggie, while Nathan returns to find he is a father. Guest starring Neil Newbon, Sarah-Louise Young and George Sweney This episode sees the death of Selena Donovan and departure of Stitch Lambert.

== Footnotes ==
^αBardock made an uncredited voiceover appearance on 10 February 2007 (episode 24), before making his first credited appearance on 17 February 2007 (episode 25).
