= Ivana Bašić (actress) =

Croatian actress

- Born: 28 February 1976 (age 50); Vranje, Serbia
- Occupation: Actress
- Years active: 2001-present

Ivana Bašić (born 28 February 1976) is a Croatian actress.

Bašić was born in Vranje, Serbia, formerly part of Yugoslavia, on 28 February 1976, and spent her early childhood there. When she was 6 years old, she and her family moved to Split, Croatia, which was also formerly part of Yugoslavia. After graduating high school, she moved to London and enrolled at the Mountview Academy of Theatre Arts.

Bašić appeared in the BBC medical drama Casualty as Serbian paramedic Snezana Lalovic.

Bašić has made a number of appearances on British television, notably on Murphy's Law and Silent Witness. In 2014 she appeared in an episode of the Channel 5 detective drama Suspects. She normally portrays a character with a central European background, an ability largely helped by her own Croatian background. She also portrayed Ilinka Blazevic in the second season of Happy Valley (2016).
