= Abdul Salis =

Ghanaian-British actor

- Occupation: Actor
- Years active: 2002–2013; 2018–present

Abdul Salis is a British actor. He played a paramedic called Curtis Cooper on the medical drama series Casualty.

== Career ==
=== Television ===
Salis has appeared in numerous television roles, including The Hidden City (2002); Casualty (2008–09), the longest-running medical drama broadcast in the UK; Trevor's World of Sport (2003), and the Doctor Who episode "Fear Her" (2006), in which he played Kel from the council. He starred in the CBBC series M.I. High, in the episode "The Big Bling," as footballer Ben Lacy.

In Father Brown (2019), season 7, episode 2, "The Passing Bell," he portrayed Enoch Rowe, an immigrant farm labourer from Trinidad. In January 2019, Salis appeared in EastEnders as Caden James.

In June 2020, Salis was announced to play Eamon Valda in Amazon's forthcoming The Wheel of Time. In 2022, he appeared as recurring character Sebastian in Catherine Tate’s six-part mockumentary sitcom Hard Cell, released on Netflix.

=== Cinema ===
Salis' film credits include Love Actually (2003), Welcome Home (2004), Animal (2004), and Sahara (2005). In Love Actually, he played Tony in the storyline involving Colin Frissell. The 2006 film Flyboys loosely portrayed aviation pioneer Eugene Jacques Bullard and the Lafayette Flying Corps; Salis played Eugene Skinner, a character inspired by Bullard.

In 2025, he starred in F1 as Dodge Dowda, the chief mechanic of the fictional F1 team APXGP.

=== Stage ===
On stage, Salis has performed in Blood Wedding and The Road at the Orange Tree Theatre, as well as Joe Guy with Tiata Fahodzi. He appeared in the 2006 production of The Exonerated at London's Riverside Studios.

In 2010, he portrayed David Taylor in the stage production of War Horse at the New London Theatre. In 2018, he played the roles of Kwame / Simon / Wole in Barber Shop Chronicles by Inua Ellams at the National Theatre.

=== Radio ===
In May 2013, Salis played the roles of Sable, Sump, Clarence, and Homeless Man in a BBC radio adaptation of Neil Gaiman's Neverwhere, adapted by Dirk Maggs. He also reprised his role as Barry in Trevor's World of Sport on Radio 4 between 2004 and 2007.

=== Video games ===
In 2022 Salis played the role of Joseph Morello in The Dark Pictures: The Devil in Me.

== Filmography ==
Film
Year	Title	Role	Notes	Ref.
2003	Love Actually	Tony		
2004	Welcome Home	Isaac		
2005	Sahara	Oumar		
2006	Flyboys	Eugene Skinner		
2024	Mufasa: The Lion King	Chigaru		
2025	F1	Dodge Dowda		

Television
Year	Title	Role	Notes	Ref.
2006	Doctor Who	Kel	Fear Her Guest star	
2008	M.I. High	Ben Lacy	Guest star	
2008-2009	Casualty	Curtis Cooper		
2019	Father Brown	Enoch Rowe	Guest star	
2021	The Wheel of Time	Eamon Valda		
2022	Hard Cell	Sebastian		
2025	Beyond Paradise	Dr Lionel Jennings	Guest star	

Video games
Year	Title	Role	Notes	Ref.
2022	The Dark Pictures Anthology: The Devil in Me	Joseph Morello		
