= Joanne King =

Irish actress

- Born: 20 April 1983 (age 43); Dublin, Ireland
- Occupation: actress
- Years active: 2005–present
- Height: 5 ft 6 in (168 cm)

Joanne King (born 20 April 1983) is an Irish actress. She played Cynthia 'Cyd' Pyke on the BBC One hospital drama Casualty and Jane Boleyn, Viscountess Rochford in the Showtime 2007–2010 series The Tudors.

== Private life ==
King was born in Dublin, the second of four children. Her father, Ronan, is an accountant and her mother, Edel, is a volunteer teacher. She attended St. Brigid's Girls' School in Cabinteely and St Joseph of Cluny Killiney. She trained at the Gaiety School of Acting, Dublin.

== Career ==
She moved to London from Ireland and was working as a BBC tour guide when she auditioned for a role on Casualty. She played Cyd (Cynthia Pyke) on Casualty.

She later played Anne Boleyn's sister-in-law, Lady Jane Rochford, in Showtime's The Tudors. Her character first appeared in the middle of Season Two in a small supporting role; this was expanded for the fourth and final season, which portrayed the downfall and execution of Lady Jane.

== Charity efforts ==
She opened a café in Bristol, which enables all profits to go to the Tenovus Cancer Care charity, funding cancer care and research.

== Television and film roles ==
- Striking Out (TV Series) (2017) as Ada O'Melia
- Angel of Decay (2016) as Sande
- Massive (2008) as Nancy
- The Tudors (2008–2010) (seasons 2–4) as Jane Boleyn, Viscountess Rochford
- Trial & Retribution ("Kill the King" – Part 2: 2008)
- Shameless (2008) as Brandi
- The Omid Djalili Show (2007)
- Casualty (2006–2007) as Cynthia 'Cyd' Pyke
- The Exile Files (2006) as Lucy Dillon
- Boy Eats Girl (2005) as a zombie

== Stage roles ==
- A Midsummer Night's Dream – 2005 – Hermia – The Pavilion Theatre
- Hamlet - 2004 – Ophelia – The Cork Opera House
- Carolling Corlorans – various characters – The Ark/Mermaid Theatre
- The Playboy of the Western World – Honour Blake – Cork Opera Hs
- G.S.A. Showcase – various characters – The Gate
- What the Dead Want – Common Girl – The Project
- The Abduction of Persephone – Sharon – G.S.A.

== Other work/skills ==
- Appeared in the Brian McFadden music video Irish Son as a businesswoman
- Movement (Adrianne Browne), stage combat (Paul Burke), Mime (Sharon O'Doherty), basic Irish and French, Basic Violin
- Radio: Romeo and Juliet, Juliet, Arklight Theatre Company
- Dance: modern dance, Tap, Ballet (Diane Richardson)
- Accents: regional Irish, English, RP, various American
- Singing: Alto

=== Voice over ===
- Forza Horizon 3 (video game) as Keira Harrison
- Forza Horizon 4 (video game) as Keira Harrison
- Forza Horizon 5 (video game) as Keira Harrison
- Dragon Age: Inquisition (video game)
- The Secret World (video game) Moutemouia
