= Janine Mellor =

English actress

- Born: 3 May 1980 (age 46); Huddersfield, United Kingdom
- Education: Bachelor of Arts (Acting)
- Alma mater: Queen Margaret University
- Occupation: Actress
- Years active: 2005 – present

Janine Mellor (born 3 May 1980) is an English actress. She is best known for playing Kelsey Phillips in BBC One's BAFTA-winning drama Casualty from 2005 to 2009.

== Biography ==
Mellor attended Lepton County Primary School, King James's School at Almondbury and Greenhead College. She danced with the Kirkheaton-based Clare Doosey School of Dance. She studied and trained at Edinburgh’s Queen Margaret University College’s School of Drama and graduated from there with an honours degree in acting. Her TV credits include South Riding and Fat Friends. From 2005 to 2009 she played the nurse Kelsey Phillips in Casualty. In 2013 she played a main role in the theatre play Marriage at the Belgrade Theatre together with Mark Fleischmann. Her other theatre credits include The Seagull, Dancing at Lughnasa, and Into the Woods.

== Filmography ==
- 2005: Fat Friends (TV Series, 5 episodes)
- 2005: Casualty@Holby City (TV Series, 2 episodes)
- 2005: Holby City (TV Series, 1 episode)
- 2005-2009: Casualty (TV Series, 169 episodes)
- 2011: South Riding (TV Series, 2 episodes)
- 2011: Coronation Street (TV Series, 1 episode)
- 2018: Doctor Who (TV Series, Episode: "The Woman Who Fell to Earth")
- 2019: Doctors (TV Series, 8 episodes)
- 2024: Doctors (TV series, portrayed Fin Sexton)
