= Sam Grey =

English actress

- Born: Samantha Grey; 19 March 1984 (age 42); Liverpool, England
- Occupations: Actress; model
- Years active: 2004–2016

Samantha "Sam" Grey (born 19 March 1984) is an English actress, most notable for her role as Health Care Assistant Alice Chantrey on Casualty. She first appeared as Alice on the first of April 2006 in the episode "Going Under". She has also starred as Jessica in Dream Team episode "War of the Roses" and Polly in Flood as well as the 2005 music video for "All I'm Made Of".

Sam has been a model since the age of 15 and has modelled for names such as Burberry, Mulberry, and Emporiana, as well as in fashion magazines such as Vogue, Elle, New Woman and Tatler.

== Filmography ==
Year	Title	Role	Notes
2006–2010, 2016	Casualty	Alice Chantrey	April 2006 – May 2010, August 2016; 159 episodes
2006	Dream Team	Jessica	
2005	Soho Story		Character name undisclosed
2004	Flood	Polly	Short movie
