= Casualty series 20 =

Twentieth series of Casualty

Casualty
- Series 20
- Starring: Luke Bailey; Ian Bleasdale; Mark Bonnar; Georgina Bouzova; Liz Carling; Susan Cookson; Elyes Gabel; Kip Gamblin; Rebekah Gibbs; Sam Grey; Martina Laird; Simon MacCorkindale; Janine Mellor; Suzanne Packer; Ben Price; James Redmond; Derek Thompson; Will Thorp; Matthew Wait
- No. of episodes: 48

Release
- Original network: BBC One
- Original release: 10 September 2005 – 26 August 2006

Series chronology
- ← Previous; Series 19 Next → Series 21

The twentieth series of the British medical drama television series Casualty commenced airing in the United Kingdom on BBC One on 10 September 2005 and finished on 26 August 2006.

== Production ==
Jane Dauncey continues as series producer for this series.

The series ran for 48 episodes, including two multi-episode crossovers with Holby City, broadcast as Casualty@Holby City. The two-parter series opener "Holding On", which features a block of flats collapsing, aired on consecutive Saturday and Sunday nights.

== Cast ==
=== Overview ===
The twentieth series of Casualty features a cast of characters working in the emergency department of Holby City Hospital and Holby Ambulance Service. Fifteen cast members from the previous series reprise their roles in this series.

Simon MacCorkindale stars as emergency medicine consultant and clinical director Harry Harper, Susan Cookson as specialist registrar in emergency medicine Maggie Coldwell, Liz Carling plays associate specialist Selena Donovan and Elyes Gabel as senior house officer Guppy Sandhu. Suzanne Packer continues her role as emergency nurse practitioner Tess Bateman with James Redmond as senior staff nurse John "Abs" Denham. Georgina Bouzova and Janine Mellor portray staff nurses Ellen Zitek and Kelsey Phillips. Ian Bleasdale stars as operational duty manager for Holby Ambulance Service Josh Griffiths. Martina Laird, Will Thorp and Matthew Wait continue their role as paramedics Comfort Jones, Woody Joyner and Luke Warren with Rebekah Gibbs starring as ambulance technician Nina Farr. Luke Bailey continues as healthcare assistant and Tess's son Sam Bateman with Derek Thompson as clinical manager Charlie Fairhead.

Mark Bonnar makes his debut as senior staff nurse Bruno Jenkins at the start of the series. Ben Price arrives in episode 15 as corporate director Nathan Spencer. Thorp departs the series in episode 18; producers axed his character after failing to connect with viewers. Bonnar departs the series in episode 25, concluding a brief appearance in the show's cast. Actress Sam Grey joins the series in episode 32 as receptionist Alice Chantrey. Wait leaves in episode 39 with his replacement Kip Gamblin joining in episode 41 as paramedic Greg Fallon, described as a "man's man who likes to live life to the full, loves nature and is into extreme sports". Gibbs exits the series in its final episode, choosing to leave Casualty in order to start a family. The actress stated "It has been an honour to work with such a professional team in front of and behind the camera".

=== Main characters ===
- Luke Bailey as Sam Bateman
- Ian Bleasdale as Josh Griffiths
- Mark Bonnar as Bruno Jenkins (episodes 1−25)
- Georgina Bouzova as Ellen Zitek
- Liz Carling as Selena Donovan
- Susan Cookson as Maggie Coldwell
- Elyes Gabel as Guppy Sandhu
- Kip Gamblin as Greg Fallon (from episode 41)
- Rebekah Gibbs as Nina Farr (until episode 48)
- Sam Grey as Alice Chantrey (from episode 32)
- Martina Laird as Comfort Jones
- Simon MacCorkindale as Harry Harper
- Janine Mellor as Kelsey Phillips
- Suzanne Packer as Tess Bateman
- Ben Price as Nathan Spencer (from episode 16)
- James Redmond as John "Abs" Denham
- Derek Thompson as Charlie Fairhead
- Will Thorp as Woody Joyner (until episode 18)
- Matthew Wait as Luke Warren (until episode 39)

Episode 18 is part of a two-part crossover with Holby City and features the following Holby City regulars:

- Hugh Quarshie as Ric Griffin
- Amanda Mealing as Connie Beauchamp
- Kelly Adams as Mickie Hendrie
- Jaye Jacobs as Donna Jackson
- Sharon D. Clarke as Lola Griffin

=== Recurring and guest characters ===
- Joanne Adams as Sergeant Edie Lennox (episode 28)
- Nick Bagnall as Lee Cull (episodes 11−15)
- Elizabeth Bell as Peggy Spencer (episodes 22−23)
- Katie Blake as Susan Haddon (episodes 3−11)
- Jack Dedman as Louis Fairhead (episodes 18−35)
- Laura Donnelly as Fleur Butler (until episode 7)
- J.S. Duffy as Si Bradwell (episode 6−7)
- Louis Emerick as Mike Bateman (episode 47)
- Ricky Fearon as Amadou Ghedi (episodes 34 and 38)
- David Firth as Richard Bardon (episode 48)
- Michael French as Nick Jordan (episode 18)
- Nicole Hall as PC Carys Williams (episodes 12 and 23)
- Alex Hardy as Warren Alpin (episodes 21 and 25)
- Julia Hills as Caroline Joyner (episode 18)
- Thomas Hudson as Jamie Coldwell (episodes 1−36)
- Thomas Law as Matt Haddon (episodes 3−14)
- Gary Mavers as Will Manning (episodes 4−5)
- Lynsey McCaffrey as Sarah Austen (episodes 5−7)
- Alex McQueen as Dr Keith Greene(episode 40)
- Paul M Merson as DC Chase (episodes 13 and 16)
- David Michaels as Jeremy Sadler (episode 16)
- Tony Mooney as Steve Coldwell (episodes 1−35)
- Arnold Oceng as Soloman Lukah (episodes 34−39)
- Jane Riley as Joanne Coldwell (episodes 1−36)
- Daniel Roberts as John Morecombe (episodes 37 and 40)
- Madhav Sharma as Jas Sandhu (episodes 3−21)
- Peter Silverleaf as Colin Evans (episode 15)
- Kamal Sylvester as PC Sagar (episode 22)
- Maryann Turner as Mary Alpin (episodes 21 and 25)
- Colin Wells as DI Jackson (episode 39)

== Episodes ==
No. overall	No. in series	Title	Directed by	Written by	Original release date	UK viewers (millions)
495	1	"Holding On – Part One"	Paul Norton Walker	Ann Marie Di Mambro	10 September 2005	7.65
Joanne is teaching a group of asylum seekers English while protesters complain about their presence. With Charlie and Selena still off sick, Tess briefs staff on MRSA protocols and Maggie meets old colleague Bruno Jenkins, who she doesn't get on with. Woody and Luke bring in a woman with an injured ankle; Woody tries to chat her up but Kelsey tells the woman that Woody has a wife and children. Protester Davie throws excrement at a group of new arrivals and his friend John Jo hits a boy with a rock; Egyptian doctor Nazem, who fled his country after converting to Christianity, saves the boy from being paralysed by stabilising him. A building expert, Imed, visits building manager Banks with evidence the asylum seekers' flats are unsafe but is ignored. The building then collapses; John Jo is killed by rubble and several people are trapped inside. Tess, Maggie, Abs and Ellen go to the scene with a medical team, while Fleur, who was visiting Sam, has to leave the department. Joanne appears uninjured but turns out to have an intracranial bleed. Bruno knows Maggie's husband Steve is in prison, not dead as she claimed, and arranges for him to visit, shocking Jamie. Kelsey shows Davie footage of him throwing the excrement: He explains his family were forcibly relocated from the flats when the building, built on a mine shaft, was deemed unsafe only for the asylum seekers to be moved in. Imed gives the police the evidence of Banks' negligence; he is searching for his son Mero but is injured saving Josh from falling rubble. Harry and Guppy learn Nazem has been performing female circumcisions: Although he took no money and only did it to make sure it was done right, he will have to be reported and probably deported. Woody finds the severed arm of a patient; it cannot be reattached but she gets her wedding ring back. Tess and fireman Lance are investigating a crying baby when the floor gives way beneath them. Guest starring Damien Nash, Phillip Lester and Kammy Darweish This episode sees the arrival of Staff Nurse, Bruno Jenkins
496	2	"Holding On – Part Two"	Paul Norton Walker	Ann Marie Di Mambro	11 September 2005	7.20
Tess and an injured Lance end up trapped in a lower level with others including Mero, who helps Tess treat Lance and the others and finds the baby she heard. They are on a platform over a sheer drop and fire crews attempt to dig a way across to them. Maggie realises Bruno called Steve to make trouble for her and Harry orders him not to tell the rest of the staff. Steve is serving eighteen years after killing a till girl during an armed robbery and is due for parole in a few months; he has been contact with Joanne for months, after Stan let slip to her that he was alive. Joanne recovers but Jamie wants nothing to do with his family. Guppy and Kelsey learn a woman from the asylum seekers service is having a relationship with one of the refugees, who is actually fifteen, not twenty as he claimed, having posed as his late older brother. Fire crews get Josh, Luke and Woody to the platform and Tess, Lance and the baby are got to safety (the other wounded having died) but Mero is still on the platform when it collapses. Imad is informed he has died but Nina later brings Mero in alive, after he somehow managed to break his fall. Guest starring Davood Ghadami, Mark Flitton and Kammy Darweish
497	3	"Deep Water"	Joss Agnew	Linda Thompson	17 September 2005	7.73
Harry tells Guppy that he is going to report Jas but Guppy convinces him to let Jas resign quietly and Jas agrees to halt the drugs trial. Fleur convinces Sam to go off his medication and help her sell sleeping tablets. An elderly homeless lady comes in; Bruno thinks she's a timewaster and tries to get Tess to force Guppy to discharge her but Tess sides with Guppy and it turns out she has a stomach ulcer. Her daughter turns up after being drunk-dialled, having not seen her in a year after she disappeared when her marriage broke down and her business failed, and they are reunited. Woody helps a young boy, Matt, whose leg has become caught in the ladder at a swimming pool, holding him above water until he is freed. Matt's mother Susan is hostile towards him and Woody later realises he had a one-night stand with her around the time Matt was conceived. An army sergeant, Morrison, is tough on a new recruit, Kim, making her keep her mask off during a gas chamber exercise until she chokes and accidentally injures another recruit lashing out. Nina knows Morrison having trained under him. Kim claims Morrison gives her a hard time because she rejected him but later admits it's a lie; Morrison explains he is harder on recruits he thinks won't make the grade, because it's better to have them fail in training than in the field. Scans shows Kim has sarcoidosis, which would end her career. She goes to a field with a rifle, intending to commit suicide, but Nina talks her down. Guest starring Stephanie Ashfield, David Royle, Sheila Reid and Julie Dawn Cole
498	4	"That's Amore"	Ashley Way	Katie Hims	24 September 2005	7.57
A man, Shane, breaks into a restaurant and tries to steal the till but ends up fighting with Enzo, the owner's son, who throws him through a window. His brother gets him to hospital and calls his pregnant girlfriend, Carrie. It turns out Enzo, who has a detached retina, is Carrie's ex. They talk about getting back together, but when he is still unable to stand up to his mother over her, and suggests seeing each other in secret, Carrie decides to ditch both Shane and Enzo. Jas tells Harry that, if he reports him, he will return the favour and report Harry for self-prescribing and working without being cleared of MRSA, and threatens to disown Guppy if he goes against him. Harry treats a trainee medic for thyroid cancer. Guppy meets a frequent flyer who talks about endlessly about his grandchildren, and becomes more indulgent on learning he actually has no-one. Josh and Woody are called out by a boy whose father took a fall while camping. He gets lost trying to lead them back to him and they split up to search. Woody eventually guides Josh to the father after climbing a tree, then has to save the son from falling off a cliff. It turns out the son thinks the father blames him for their dog eating poison and the pair reconcile. Woody has Sam look up Matt's date of birth and learns it matches. Sam is surprised when Fleur cancels a night out to accept a dinner invitation from Tess. Ellen tells Kelsey she is in love with a married man. Hearing Selena is being discharged from hospital, she arranges for her to catch her with Will. Selena walks out and Will throws Ellen out after her. Guest starring Samual Oatley, Bobby Scott Freeman and Chris Simmons
499	5	"Paper Moon"	Gwennan Sage	Ginnie Hole	1 October 2005	6.42
Sean, an inmate at a young offenders institute, is brought in after swallowing razor blades. Abs, who spent time in there, recalls one of the officers with him, Calder, as a bully and realises Mark, a boy hanging around reception, is planning to break him out of jail, convincing him to leave. Sean was being bullied and tried to report it, but Calder told the bully about the report, resulting in him being gang raped. Luke and Nina try to transport him to St James for surgery but Mark thinks they are taking him back to young offenders and rams the ambulance. Mark is arrested, as is Calder after punching his colleague, and Sean is taken to surgery. Will turns up to speak to Selena and she throws a bottle of urine over him. Nina is visited by an old army colleague, Sarah, who it turns out she had a relationship with, a fact she hides from Abs. A young man is brought in after having a seizure in his hand while working on a lighting rig. Harry and Bruno realise his symptoms are consistent with Huntington's. His mother admits she had an affair with a friend around the time he was conceived who later died of Huntington's and never knew whether he or her husband was the father. One of Jas' patients is brought in with angina; it transpires Jas didn't run the proper tests on him and he probably has cancer. Harry and Guppy advise him to report Jas. Guest starring John McGlynn, Iain Robertson and Danny Tennant
500	6	"Sticks and Stones"	Brett Fallis	Stephen McAteer	8 October 2005	6.44
A new paramedic, Si, turns up at the station. Although he isn't on the roster, Comfort allows him to accompany Woody. Josh is at the hospital undergoing retraining and is placed under Bruno's supervision. An elderly woman dies of a stroke and Josh accidentally upsets her husband by wrongly stating there won't be a post-mortem. Harry reveals Charlie is taking a sabbatical to teach an advanced carers' course. Two sisters get into a fight, with the older one beating the younger one who had been bullying her. Their mother, who is part of a protest group against a paedophile being rehoused in the area which had earlier blocked an ambulance's path, assumes he attacked them and the older sister goes along with it. Selena is suspicious and it turns out the younger sister has internal bleeding and a tampon thrust down her throat. She had been taunting her older sister about going through puberty before her; the older sister's puberty has been delayed because of her poor diet. Jas is escorted from the hospital and disowns Guppy. Woody is annoyed when an older woman complains of back pains solely so the paramedics will move a wardrobe for her but Si helps her out. A patient complaining of toothache is actually researching ghost sightings at the hospital. When Selena tells him he has angina, he doesn't believe her and leaves. Woody and Si find him collapsed and Si makes a mess of treating him. Woody realises he is an imposter and handcuffs him to the ambulance. Nina tells Abs the truth about Sarah, which leaves him uncomfortable. Tess lets Fleur organise a party at the house for Sam's birthday but is shocked when she tries to turn it into a rave while Fleur is annoyed Tess has invited staffmembers. Fleur drugs Tess and stands over her with a knife. Guest starring Roy Dotrice, Philip Franks and Jennie Lucey
501	7	"All's Fair in Love and War" (Note: See also "All's Fair" series 5, "All's Fair" series 10 & "All's Fair" series 16)	Jill Robertson	Stephen McAteer	15 October 2005	7.06
Fleur leaves Tess on the bed upstairs and tells Sam she passed out drunk. Si flees when Woody nearly crashes the ambulance and they stumble across a man impaled on railings. Woody sends Si to summon help, calling in Harry and Comfort. Si explains he has a first aid certificate and wanted to help but realises how serious being a paramedic is. Woody reports him to the police but lets him leave. Susan admits she isn't sure if Woody is Matt's father or not but agrees to him getting to know him. Josh finds a teenage girl dead in the toilets from an overdose. He is incensed to learn that Bruno spoke to her and dismissed her as a timewaster. Guppy learns his mother won't speak to him. A woman is brought in with bowel obstructions and her son worries she has cancer like his father, who died three years ago. In fact, she has a hernia from dancing with her new boyfriend. Abs speaks to a friend, Joey, who knows Fleur and considers her a psychopath. Abs, Nina and Sarah go to the house where Fleur barricades herself, Sam and the unconscious Tess in the bedroom. She tries to get Sam to join her in a suicide pact but he refuses and stops her attacking Tess. Fleur is taken into custody, Abs and Nina make up and Sam is convinced to get help. Guest starring Anthony Flanagan, Angela Curran and Richard Trinder
502	8	"For Better or Worse"	Gill Wilkinson	Peter Mills and Lucy Catherine	22 October 2005	7.29
A young girl gets up during the night to get an ice cream and is found in the freezer by her mother next morning. The parents clash at the hospital but after a lengthy period warming her up, the staff manage to restart the girl's heart and she is taken to intensive care. Harry's au pair quits on him suddenly so Ellen takes over looking after the children and manages to convince Kizzy of the importance of what he does. Woody spends time with Matt without telling him he might be his father and takes him out in an ambulance, but when they are pulled over to the scene of a car crash, Josh reprimands him. Guppy finds a woman has a worm in her foot from drinking infected water and Bruno charges staff for a look. The patient takes some of the money off him, unaware how much he really made. An Asian woman is brought in after being beaten up. Suspicion falls on her husband but another man brought in after a beating turns out to be a loan shark who ordered the first beating; his wife is disgusted by his attitude. Guest starring Frances Grey, Tom Lewis and Lucinda Dryzek
503	9	"Teacher's Pet"	Rob Evans	Jason Sutton	24 October 2005	5.56
Josh, Comfort, Woody and Luke are putting on demonstrations at an unruly school, where only new headteacher Carl seems to have any influence. One of the boys, Kris, is possessive of his girlfriend Emma, who is actually having an affair with a teacher, Nick. Carl is aware and is letting Nick resign quietly to avoid a scandal. At the hospital, a young man, Conner, comes in after an accident sword swallowing. Tess tells Kelsey to get rid of a pumpkin lantern which Conner's friend Beth slips on. Abs learns Beth is actually Conner's social worker, Charlotte, and was worried that Conner's actions made her look bad. Two of the boys, Adam and Neil, steal entonox gas from an ambulance to get high. Another one, Adrian, encourages Emma to try apple bopping and she and her friend Shania are badly burned by a chemical in the water; Emma asks for Nick, tipping off everyone. Frustrated at the lack of space, Josh ends up hitting a young boy, Jack, and Woody considers reporting him. As the ambulances are leaving, Nick is attacked by Kris and his gang. Luke, Woody and Comfort step in and he is taken to one of the ambulances but Kris and the others attack it, throwing Luke out and driving off with Comfort and Nick on board. Guest starring James Gaddas, James Anthony Pearson and Jason Maza Note: This was Part 1 of a Casualty@Holby City crossover, comprising four 30-minute episodes
504	10	"Crash and Burn"	Rob Evans	Jason Sutton	25 October 2005	5.96
Josh chases the ambulance on his bike, while Comfort is beaten by Kris and his friends trying to protect Nick. The ambulance crashes into a car and the boys free. The couple in the car, Edgar and Moji, are treated; Edgar is awaiting a heart transplant and Moji hides the fact she is pregnant from him. Nick needs surgery. Carl finds Adrian at the hospital and realises he was behind the acid and still has a vial; Adrian is burned while Carl is getting it away from him. Luke tells Josh they will support him over hitting Jack. A woman, May, fakes abdominal pains to get staff to investigate her boyfriend Perry. Tess learns he has Parkinson's disease. He tells May who agrees to give the relationship a chance. Tess discovers Comfort has collapsed from a head injury. Guest starring James Gaddas, James Anthony Pearson and Jason Maza Note: This is Part 2 of the 4-part Casualty@Holby City crossover
505	11	"Big Bang Theory"	Steve Kelly	Ray Brooking	5 November 2005	7.84
A middle-aged Asian couple, Aman and Namjeev, are brought in along with Namjeev's mother after someone stuffed fireworks through their letterbox. Namjeev attempts to call her son, Ajit, who is working in a warehouse but two youths, Lee and Ben, throw fireworks through the window, badly burning him; Lee is also burned while Ben is impaled after falling. It transpires that Ben's sister Jody has been seeing Ajit and is pregnant. Ajit's family accept her and Guppy throws Lee out when he is abusive towards him, although Lee gives him a chilling warning as he leaves. A barrister is brought in after being assaulted and Bruno correctly guesses she is a victim of domestic violence but Selena is unable to convince her to report her husband. A teenage girl and her friend think she is being stalked by one of her clients as a "cyber-girlfriend". They chase a man following them and he is hit by a car. He turns out to have her photo and her mother's contact details; he is a private detective hired by her parents to find out where her new wealth was coming from. Sam returns to work. Ellen convinces Harry to let her put on a fireworks display for his family. Josh and Luke meet with Jack's father Marcus who decides not to make a complaint, but Woody is still considering making one anyway. Guest starring Shobu Kapoor, Jodi Albert and Kika Mirylees
506	12	"Love and Duty"	Craig Lines	Linda Thompson	12 November 2005	8.50
A group of gay Gulf War veterans are holding a Remembrance Day memorial. Lee and his friends disrupt it and start a brawl, in which one of the soldiers, Jon, is injured and Lee's brother Dean is left behind when the others flee. Bruno later smuggles Lee in to see Dean. A reporter tries to paint Jon and another soldier, Ray, as a couple but in fact Jon is in a relationship with Tommy, a police sergeant and a former military policeman. Tommy is forced to admit he took part in the persecution of gay soldiers before the rules changed. He tries to commit suicide in his garage but Josh saves him and Jon stands by him. Woody decides not to report Josh. An elderly man and a young girl are putting a ship inside a bottle when it is dropped and the man is showered with glass. Staff assume the girl is his granddaughter but his daughter considers her a charity case; her older sister is in trouble with the police but she is trying to do better and presents the older man with a ship her sister stole. Maggie and Ellen treat a medical student whose crotch has been encased in plaster by his friends. Abs is uncomfortable with Nina going for a drink with Kelsey. Guppy is attacked by Lee and his friends outside the hospital. Abs sees the beating (but not who is being attacked) from a distance but makes no attempt to intervene. Guest starring Paul Sadot, Simon O'Brien and Tony Selby
507	13	"Antisocial Behaviour"	Luke Watson	Gregory Evans	19 November 2005	8.53
A cyclist is brought in after being hit by a car and dies in Resus. The elderly driver has been pushing herself doing volunteer work since her husband died. A man is trying to rig the electric meter in his flat but this results in his girlfriend suffering an electric shock. Her son seems very distracted and has a history of violence. When Luke and Nina turns up, he becomes agitated and falls down the stairs. The boyfriend tries to sue the paramedics but Maggie learns he has been keeping his girlfriend on tranquilisers for six years and Sam realises her son has undiagnosed Asperger's syndrome. The boyfriend is ordered out of their flat and escorted from the hospital by Security. A man, Ian, sees his wife Sandra with a co-worker, Steve, and deliberately drives a forklift into him, injuring them both. It transpires Sandra is undergoing treatment for breast cancer and Steve has been supporting her, since Ian has never coped with the death of their son from leukaemia. Ian agrees to get help. Harry and Ellen nearly kiss. Guppy reports his attack to the police and Lee and his friends are questioned and released on bail. Even though Guppy needs a witness to make the charges stick, Abs keeps quiet about what he saw and Guppy receives a threatening phone call. Guest starring Trish Cooke, Victoria Alcock and Lucy O'Connell
508	14	"Getting Involved"	Emma Bodger	Paul Ebbs	26 November 2005	7.80
A group of travellers, siblings Vancy and Nelson and Vancy's boyfriend Larry, have been staying on farmland with owner Colin's permission but his wife Megan wants them out and threatens them with a dog. The dog is later killed, provoking Colin into attacking the caravan with a bulldozer. Colin, Larry and Vancy are all injured in the scuffle. Vancy reveals she is pregnant but it turns out to be ectopic. Larry, who has only been with the travellers a few months, turns out to be the one who killed the dog and is thrown out. Colin tells the others they can stay. A new patient monitor is delivered which alerts to patients being in the department more than four hours. Bruno takes bets as to which doctor will breach first and bets on Selena, hiding the x-rays so she spends a long time with an elderly patient with cataracts. Selena confiscates his winnings, intending to donate them to charity. Ellen learns Harry has gone away for two months. A DNA test reveals Woody isn't Matt's father and he tells the boy they won't see each other as much. Sales manager Sharon has taken her staff skiing for a team building exercise and bullies one of them, Erica. She delays helping her when she falls and another skier, Becky, crashes into them. Becky has pretended to her boyfriend Robert that she comes from a privileged background but is actually a menial worker and has never skied before. She admits the truth and Robert asks her to move in with him. Erica calls Sharon's boyfriend for her but he is with his pregnant wife; seeing Sharon has no-one else, Erica takes her home. Abs admits to Nina that he saw the attack on Guppy but isn't going to come forward. Guppy attends a line-up at the police station but afterwards is threatened again by Lee and his friends. Guest starring Claire-Louise Cordwell, James Weaver and Dannielle Brent
509	15	"Skin Deep"	Dominic Lees	Jo O'Keefe	3 December 2005	6.88
A young woman has been apprenticed to a tree cutter as part of a reparation scheme. The cutter falls from a branch and is left suspended by his harness with chest injuries. The apprentice summons Comfort and Nina and helps get him down, with him offering her a placement when he recovers. An elderly woman dies of heart failure and Bruno earns commission by putting her estranged son in touch with a funeral director. The owner of a homeless refuge is brought in with high blood pressure. Her boyfriend learns she has been taking cocaine to cope with the pressure. A woman is attracted by a barking dog to the fact that her neighbour has collapsed with gallstones. He is reluctant to go to hospital, since he has a genetic condition which has left his face disfigured with tumours, but bonds with his neighbour when she offers to look after his dog. Colin dares a boy in reception to try out his new stab vest and the boy stabs him in the bottom with a pencil, which Maggie has to remove. Tess and Ellen discover Bruno is rigging discharge times by removing patients from the system early and backdating the notes, but he avoids immediately repercussions with a speech about duty of care. Abs finally admits the truth to Guppy and offers to go to the police but then Jas is brought in after being beaten up by Lee's gang. Guppy convinces Harry to come in from leave to help out and Jas is rushed into surgery. Guest starring Stacey Sampson, Brendan Charleson and Janice Acquah
510	16	"Enough's Enough"	Rob MacGillivray	Danny McCahon	10 December 2005	7.57
Harry returns to duty and is unhappy with the waiting board, clashing with new director Nathan Spencer. When beds become available, Harry and Tess decide to send up the patients who have waited longest rather than ones under four hours, causing Nathan to threaten to have Harry replaced. A young boy is brought in by his mother and grandmother with a burnt arm and signs of abuse are found. He says his mother deliberately spilt a drink over him and the grandmother tells Abs and Tess her daughter is a self-harmer. When the entire family disappear, Comfort and Nina go to the house with the police and find mother and son tied up; the grandmother has been abusing them both and the mother was trying to alert the authorities. The boy is taken into care, with his mother happy that he'll be looked after. A Kosovan refugee has been helping a builder get cheap workers, including his own brother. When his brother has an accident, he agrees to take him off the site before calling an ambulance. His brother reveals he doesn't want to be in the UK and they decide to report the builder, not caring if they're deported. A woman is pushed through a glass table after picking up someone else's baby in a café. She tries to hide from her husband, obsessed with saving money for IVF, but the couple are delighted when Ellen reveals she is already pregnant. Guppy tells DC Chase that he won't testify against Lee, even though Abs has now come forward. Abs convinces Ajeet to give evidence against the gang. Guppy later looks at Jas' notes and learns he has a brain tumour and only has weeks to live. Guest starring Anita Carey, Antonia Campbell-Hughes and Trevor Dwyer-Lynch Nathan Spencer is introduced
511	17	"Do They Know it's Christmas?"	Declan O'Dwyer	Ann Marie Di Mambro	17 December 2005	8.09
A stressed store manager, Mike, is receiving a visitor from his superior, Alister. When a difficult customer wants to buy a TV set that is roped off until tomorrow, Alister orders the section opened, causing a stampede in which shelves are knocked down and several people injured. Bernie, a wheelchair-using customer, makes her own way to hospital to get treatment for minor injuries and tells Abs her parents prayed for a miracle instead of accepting her as she was. A girl hanging around the store, Gemma, turns out to be the daughter of trainee Kyle, whose leg was crushed and who couldn't find a babysitter. Alister wants to blame the incident on Kyle but Mike insists on telling the truth even if it costs him his job. A woman with end stage cardio disease is brought in and refuses treatment, not wanting her daughter to see her die at Christmas. Guppy convinces her daughter to accept it. David, a man reliant on a wheelchair, gives Nathan £20,000 he raised with a sponsored dance but Nathan intends to spend it on administrative costs. David and Bernie strike up an abrasive friendship and attend the staff Christmas party, where Nathan is forced to agree to spend the money on a new defibrillator. Maggie, Tess and Bruno criticise Harry for not standing up to Nathan. He considers resigning but Ellen convinces him not to and they kiss. Nina rejects Bruno, who causes trouble between her and Abs by spreading a rumour she slept with Woody. Kelsey and Woody get on well but he falls asleep on her. Guppy visits Jas, who is initially friendly but turns on him when Guppy refuses to help him die. Guest starring Ben Roberts, Steven Cartait and Glen Wallace
512	18	"Deny Thy Father"	Paul Harrison	Al Hunter Ashton and Pete Hambly	24 December 2005	8.00
Ric and Harry are interviewing for a new locum general consultant: Nick Jordan applies but Ric is reluctant to hire him. Donna, Kelsey and Woody convince Nick to give them a lift to a staff Christmas party. Charlie is also going, with Caroline babysitting Louis, but Louis is upset to learn Charlie has a new girlfriend, Helen, and ends up running away. A cab driver, Bernie, deliberately drives his car into the office of his rival, Mitch, landing them both in hospital. Bernie's daughter Tara is seeing Mitch's son Lee but her brother Sean drags her from the hospital. Lee gives chase and causes a pile-up in a motorway tunnel, which Charlie and Nick's cars are caught in. Selena is close by and Maggie arrives with the ambulance crew but Harry is caught in traffic trying to reach the scene and emergency services have trouble getting access. Kelsey is claustrophobic and Charlie gets her to sit with an injured Helen. Tara is trapped and Charlie and Nick argue over whether to amputate her foot. Donna finds a man, David, impaled in his car with his baby son Alfie. Father and son Derek and Alan worry about the chemicals in their vehicle but an attempt to remove them causes a partial collapse of the tunnel. Lee is carried to safety after Selena finds him lying injured outside the tunnel but Woody's attempt to free David causes the tunnel entrance to collapse completely. Guest starring Fiona Glascott, Gary Whelan and Sarah Winman Woody Joyner departs. Part one of a Casualty@Holby City Christmas crossover. For part two, see Holby City, Series 8, Episode 11
513	19	"Out of your Depth"	Joss Agnew	Catherine Tregenna	31 December 2005	6.63
A teenage girl, Petra, is holding a New Year's Eve party at her posh house with her shy friend Tanya. Tanya ends up being knocked into the pool at the same time as a boy, Ellis, dives into it and lands on her. Petra clears up evidence of the party as Josh and Nina collect Ellis, then gives Tanya cocaine and takes her clubbing, causing her to collapse. Harry had earlier rushed Ellis out of theatre but gives Charlie and Maggie time to diagnose Tanya after Petra conceals information, defending them to Nathan. He is unhappy to learn Ellen engineered the situation to win back the staff's support. Guppy asks Harry's advice about Jas but Harry refuses to help Jas die. A woman is brought in from a nursing home; she was declared to be in a permanent vegetative state after a failed attempt to hang herself during a bout of post-natal depression but Abs learns she actually has locked-in syndrome. Her husband brings their son in to see her; he has moved on and has a new girlfriend but they all resolve to make the situation work. Bruno treats a member of a stripping troupe who burned his chest with hot wax. Abs wins Nina over by joining the troupe stripping outside the hospital. Guest starring Amy Shiels, Katy Allen and Neil Newbon
514	20	"Poisoned Love"	Shani S. Grewal	Peter Mills	7 January 2006	8.18
A boy is looking after his baby sister for his alcoholic mother. He tries to steal some vodka from a shop and ends up colliding with a man trying to steal drugs from a doctor's surgery, injuring his leg. When the staff see him putting vodka in the baby's milk, they realise she is suffering from withdrawals as a result of the mother drinking during pregnancy. The drug thief goes back to the surgery and gives the GP a beating; he and the boy's mother are a couple and flee the area with the boy, although he arranges for his sister to be left with Guppy and Abs. The GP turns out to have been self-prescribing oxycodone, which his receptionist substituted for iron tablets causing him to overdose. Kelsey encourages the receptionist to tell him she has feelings for him. One of the GP's patients turns up needing jabs for a holiday; Bruno gives them to her for payment and she covers for him with Tess by claiming she is doing volunteer work abroad. Harry agrees to go to a concert with Ellen. Guppy supplies Jas with a syringe full of a lethal dose but he is too weak to use it. Guest starring Dominic Letts, Leanne Lakey and Beverley Hills
515	21	"Crossing the Line" (Note: See also "Crossing the Line" series 9)	Chris Lovett	Ming Ho	14 January 2006	8.26
Dee, a diabetic with renal failure, is brought in and the staff learn she has been refusing treatment, since she doesn't want her husband Kenny to be burdened looking after her any longer. Harry reluctantly resuscitates her when she arrests, and she agrees to go on the transplant list and accept treatment on condition Kenny goes back to work. A young man, Daniel, is angry to see his sister Karen meeting with their estranged father Martin, who walked out on them fifteen years ago and has a new family. Daniel accidentally pushes Martin in front of a road cleaner, trapping his arm. Nina and Ellen stop to help until Luke and Comfort arrive. Martin has angina and might lose the arm but the family are reconciled. Bruno poses as Charlie to take possession of prescription pads and sells one to a young man, Warren, but is concerned that Warren intends to use them to get withdrawn arthritis medication for his grandmother Mary, an elderly farmer that Maggie and Tess have been treating. Guppy asks Harry to give Jas a lethal injection but after the experience with Dee he refuses. They later hear Jas has suffocated himself with a plastic bag. Guest starring Philip Middlemiss, Yvonne Rochester Duncan and Eric Deacon
516	22	"The Things We Do for Love"	Marc Jobst	Jason Sutton and Catherine Tregenna	21 January 2006	8.14
A security guard, Andy, attempts to propose to his girlfriend Becky by bungee jumping in front of her office window but a problem with the winch causes him to crash through the window. Josh and Nina summon Harry for help and when Luke and Comfort arrive as back-up, they narrowly escape injury when the winch falls on their ambulance. Andy knows Becky has been having an affair with a colleague but after some thought she accepts the proposal. Abs treats a man who has partially severed his hand on machinery. He said he did it because someone was telling him to hurt his wife and realises he has been hearing voices; he is admitted for psychiatric treatment. Nathan's mum Peggy comes in with a fractured wrist and Nathan insists Harry treat her. Harry just gets her out in under four hours, only to learn the x-ray hasn't been checked and she needs to come back in. Bruno boasts to Kelsey about doing agency work for extra money when he was meant to be on a course. Maggie forces him to own up and do the course unpaid. He gets his revenge by recording her complaining about Nathan and giving the tape to a journalist. Guest starring Lisa Stevenson, Craig Heaney, Steve Huison and Jane Hazlegrove
517	23	"It's a Man Thing"	John Dower	Jim Davies and Steve Lightfoot	28 January 2006	7.75
Harry's relationship with Ellen is threatened when he realises that all eyes are upon him, prompting him to deny the rumours and end the relationship. Selena treats Peggy after another fall and learns she has an irregular heart beat, before accepting a dinner invitation from Nathan. A boy racer, Gary, is brought up short when his motorbike hits a pram containing a baby, Joanna. His brother Tony had been chastising him for ignoring his own child, Danny. After a talking to from Charlie, Gary agrees to sell his bikes to support his family, since his girlfriend Sasha is pregnant again. Abs realises that Joanna's father Jake has post-natal depression and tries to convince him to stay with his family. Maggie realises Bruno set her up after her comments appear in the paper. Kelsey learns Bruno is doing Botox injections on the sly but keeps quiet if he stops and gives her a free treatment. Harry and Abs treat a man who has swallowed a parasitic fish. Guest starring Alex Palmer, Callum Dixon and Nadine Lewington
518	24	"Trust in Me"	Deborah Paige	Stephen McAteer	4 February 2006	7.98
A pregnant woman is leaving her husband after learning he is having an affair but goes into labour while driving on a country road. Her young son calls for an ambulance but a miscommunication leaves Josh and Luke searching for them on the wrong road. The boy calls the hospital and Harry, Selena and Ellen talk him through delivering the baby. He tries to attract the ambulance's attention and is hit by a police car which then crashes, leaving three casualties. The mother tells her husband they will stay together while their son recovers and decide what happens then. Charlie and Maggie treat an elderly woman who has been mugged. A drug addict is brought in by the police after being caught breaking into a house. She has hepatitis B and ends up dying of live failure; Maggie is angry that she wasn't given treatment. Bruno gives Kelsey the botox injection but it goes wrong and she has to cancel her date. Charlie realises what Bruno has been doing but is unable to prove it when Kelsey covers for him. Ellen tells Harry she is pregnant but he doesn't believe her. Guest starring Katherine Igoe, Greg Sheffield and Mark Benson
519	25	"Out of the Past"	Emma Bodger	Jo O'Keefe	11 February 2006	7.11
A girl, Jenna, is celebrating her 12th birthday at a funfair but is bothered by the presence of Viv, who she believes is her father Ian's new girlfriend. While Viv is looking after her, she apparently has an asthma attack but Ellen realises she is faking to get Viv into trouble. Viv reveals she is actually Jenna's mother, who walked out on the family when Jenna was young. Jenna climbs out a window and Viv falls through a greenhouse roof going after her. Jenna insists on staying at the hospital to make sure she's all right. A man comes in after injuring himself in the groin with a saw; he and his wife have been trying for a baby and he is delighted to learn she is pregnant. Nina initially disbelieves Ellen's pregnancy claim until Ellen does a pregnancy test in front of her. Sam considers doing a shift with Luke on the ambulances. Bruno is accosted by Lynn, who he gave a navel piercing to: It has become infected and she demands compensation. He tries to treat her on the quiet but Charlie and Maggie find out and discovered she has a perforated appendix. Mary tries to get her illicit medication but the pharmacist rings Charlie and informs him the medication is dangerous with her warfarin. Mary is brought in with internal bleeding; Bruno stays to help treat her but she dies. Warren tells Charlie everything and Bruno is arrested. Guest starring Heather Peace, Amy Harvey and Huw Higginson This episode sees the departure of Senior Staff Nurse, Bruno Jenkins
520	26	"The Lost Boys"	Paul Wroblewski	Sian Evans	18 February 2006	7.77
A boy, Carl, is treated for a fractured wrist. The man with him, Stuart, claims to be his father but drives off without him. Carl and Jason, who had claimed to be his brother, recruit another boy, Ryan, who is now living with his nan, but while crossing a railway track, Jason is electrocuted and Carl falls down an embankment. Sam accompanies Luke and Nina to the scene and ends up being left behind when they leave with Jason, finding Carl with an ankle injury and having to be talked through treatment over the phone by Luke. Jason dies in Resus and it transpires the boys were in care together and Stuart has been getting them to steal for him; he is arrested. Tess comforts Sam, not realising he enjoyed the experience. A young girl is brought in by her mother after falling from a climbing frame. Her father, who has little to do with her, insists on an investigation into old injuries but it transpires the girl has a clotting disorder. Nina tells Harry that Ellen is telling the truth. Nathan apologises to Maggie for blaming her for the leak and offers to do her a favour. After she treats a rent boy who has hepatitis B and was beaten and raped, she asks Nathan to let her set up a clinic to immunise drug addicts and sex workers against hepatitis B. When Selena, Kelsey and Tess back her up, he agrees. Guest starring Morgan Jones, James O'Hanlon and Zak Maguire
521	27	"Worlds Apart"	Steve Finn	Ann Marie Di Mambro	25 February 2006	8.05
Harry proposes to Ellen who accepts. Drug addict brothers Martin and Steven drag a young man, Daniel, to a warehouse and shoot him, although Martin is also accidentally shot. A young prostitute, Jade, is thrown out of a car nearby and calls an ambulance for Daniel. His mother, Morven, is a judge who has been going hard on drug offenders and is an old friend of Harry and Beth. She assumes Daniel is back on drugs but in fact he has been exposing drug dealers; his mother got him into rehab but his girlfriend, who only got into drugs because of him, overdosed. Ellen criticises Morven's handling of the affair; Harry takes Morven's side but she later admits Ellen is right. Steven delays getting Martin medical treatment and he dies in Resus; Steven is arrested. Ellen stops Harry announcing their engagement, having realised they're too different for it to work. Jade is one of Maggie and Kelsey's first clients at the clinic. Maggie is incensed to learn that older prostitute Lou is actually Jade's mother and Jade has contracted herpes after taking jobs on her own, being caught berating her by Selena and Nathan. A well-meaning but clumsy novice nun causes her superior to slip and suffer minor injuries. Sam wants to resign and become a paramedic but Comfort tells him he needs to be twenty-one. He decides to resign anyway and Charlie convinces him to become a healthcare assistant. Guest starring Joseph Altin, Frances Tomelty and Christine Adams
522	28	"Nobody's Perfect" (Note: See also "Nobody's Perfect" series 9 & "Nobody's Perfect" series 16)	Gill Wilkinson	Gregory Evans	4 March 2006	8.26
Selena is called out as a police surgeon after a woman, Daisy, puts her hand through a glass door, after tracking her boyfriend David when he took their baby Sophie and took refuge with his estranged wife Stella. Selena refuses to section her and she is taken to hospital, where Abs finds signs of paranoid delusions. She flees the hospital, stabs Stella and kidnaps Sophie. Selena and policewoman Edie track her to a church roof; Selena gets her to hand Sophie over and Edie stops her jumping. Stella refuses to take David back. Selena resigns as police surgeon and Nathan fails to comfort her. Charlie tries to help the Hep B clinic by handing out leaflets in the red light district but is menaced by an angry pimp, mugged and finally arrested for soliciting, with Josh having to bail him out. Sam tells Tess of his plans. An elderly man with glaucoma is brought in; he has refused to take medication since his wife died because of an anaesthetic mistake. One of his daughters has been letting him spoke marijuana but it turns out his problems have been caused by his other daughter: She has been making him herbal tea but accidentally used foxglove instead of comfrey leaves. A bullying chef chastises a subordinate and accidentally gets his foot impaled with a knife. The subordinate later collapses from amphetamine use. Harry convinces the chef to talk to him about his own usage, which results in the junior resigning. Guest starring Sarah Lyle, Michael Mueller and Mary Woodvine
523	29	"Heroes and Villains"	Joss Agnew	Steve Lightfoot	11 March 2006	7.89
Brothers Joe and Tommy have been hired to rob a house whose new owners have yet to move in but one of the owners, Mina, turns up unexpectedly and chases their van in her car. Both vehicles crash; Tommy flees the scene while Mina wrecks her leg and Joe has spinal injuries. Maggie and Abs help paramedics at the scene but Joe dies in hospital. Tommy is arrested after an altercation with Mina's husband Alan, who admits he set up the robbery for the insurance and turns himself in to the police. It is Sam's first day as an HCA and Selena asks him to discharge an elderly patient; instead, he makes him a sandwich, causing him to breach the four hour rule. Ellen suffers nausea and spotting and fears something is wrong with the pregnancy, asking Harry to arrange a scan. Nathan is threatening to shut down the hep B clinic because of lack of activity. A woman, Karen, is brought in after collapsing in the street. Kelsey seems to recognise her and lets her discharge herself but Selena realises she has had a minor heart attack and may have a major one without treatment. Kelsey gets Luke to take her to the massage parlour where she knows Karen works; Kelsey worked there herself for two weeks but convinces Luke she was just the receptionist. Karen agrees to return to the hospital and recommend the hep B clinic. Guest starring Seeta Indrani, Neil Daglish and Gilbert Wynne
524	30	"Family Matters" (Note: See also "Family Matters" series 7 & "Family Matters" series 27)	Ashley Way	Danny McCahon	18 March 2006	7.94
A band are playing a gig but their would-be manager has arranged fireworks that cause the rig to collapse on two band members during rehearsal. The pair argue as they are freed but mostly makes amends. Jocelyn, a woman whose son has just been sent to jail, learns his girlfriend Kendra is intending to give their baby away to a co-worker, Sheena. Kendra suffers a fall during an argument and needs an emergency caesarean. When Jocelyn makes it clear she cares about Kendra surviving more than the baby, Kendra decides to keep the child. A boy falls off his school roof; his teacher wants him certified as having learning difficulties so he can get extra help but his father refuses to allow it, even after Sam learns the boy jumped trying to fly. The teacher determines to press ahead anyway. Selena breaks up with Nathan, feeling he showers her with gifts but shows her no real affection. Ellen goes for a scan but there is no baby. Harry tells her she had a molar pregnancy which has left a growth on her womb. Guest starring Alison Newman, Annette Chown and Caroline Guthrie
525	31	"Walk Before You Run"	Brett Fallis	Peter Mills	25 March 2006	8.23
Josh is leading a group of paramedics on duty at a charity race. Among the contestants are Debbie, who is running in memory of her daughter who died of cystic fibrosis and whose son Jamie is among the marshals, and social media influencer Lorraine and her friend Sandra. An elderly man, Walter, is driving his wife Florence to hospital but is distracted by her behaviour and runs over Jamie. He calls an ambulance but then carries on to hospital, also changing the signs so several runners go off course. Debbie stumbles into a bog and Sandra goes to get help; Nina climbs over boards to help rescue her and tells Josh she wants to train as a paramedic. Jamie turns out to have two broken legs. Florence has a urinary infection and Walter confesses to the police. Debbie's husband Mark accuses her of putting her fundraising ahead of their family while she accuses him of not wanting to talk about their daughter; Selena helps them see each other's point of view and they reconcile. Lorraine tries to finish the course for the publicity but trips and bites her tongue. Nina tries to put a cannula in without authorisation and badly scratches her. Josh agrees to train her anyway and Sandra arranges for Lorraine to be photographed by the press in hospital. Comfort arranges a date with first aider Nick. Harry visits Ellen, who has had the growth removed and tells him she might have cancer. Guest starring Sarah-Jane Holm, Stephen Beckett and John Nettleton
526	32	"Going Under"	Lesley Manning	Ming Ho	1 April 2006	7.75
A man, Barry, attends the 15th anniversary of his neighbours Nigel and Simone; Nigel has just been promoted at work while Barry has been made redundant. Barry pours chemicals into the hot tub, causing toxic fumes which leave Simone hospitalised along with Barry's daughter Emma. Barry suffers an electric shock trying to hide the evidence and he and Nigel make their peace. Sam is asked to train his replacement as receptionist, Alice Chantrey. He comes to her rescue from a troublesome patient who turns out to be a diabetic having problems with insulin. A patient with sciatica turns out to have mismanaged his medication to stop his fiancé taking a job abroad. Selena reveals the truth but Abs helps the couple reconcile. Ellen learns she has cancer and needs chemotherapy, telling Nina to keep it quiet. Maggie and Selena find Nathan has been collecting CCTV footage of Selena which he tells them is part of a review of security problems. Guest starring Stephen Kennedy, Emma Linley and Sammy T. Dobson Alice Chantrey is introduced
527	33	"Blind Spots"	Paul Murphy	Linda Thompson	8 April 2006	7.72
Louis sneaks off to a skate park but is involved in a collision with his friend Niall that leaves them both with minor injuries. When Niall learns Josh lives with the family, he assumes he and Charlie are a couple. Maggie convinces Louis to own up to Charlie and he tells Niall that Charlie and Maggie are together. A lorry driver is nearly involved in an accident when she has trouble with her gears and then falls from the cab. Alice has trouble finding her notes and Harry eventually learns she has been diagnosed with multiple sclerosis but refused to accept it. When she collapses on leaving the hospital, she agrees to get treatment. Luke discovers a boy in an altercation with a drug dealer who he claims went after him for a debt. Luke gives him money to pay the family's bill, but on being called out to a domestic involving the boy's mother and stepfather, learns he stole from them to fund his habit and has now used Luke's money for a fix. Not wanting anyone to know about her treatment, Ellen tells Harry she got the all clear and tells Tess and Kelsey she was never pregnant, leaving them to assume she made it up. Guest starring Tracy Whitwell, James Bowers and Katherine Manners
528	34	"First Impressions" (Note: See also "First Impressions" series 9, "First Impressions" series 18 & "First Impressions" series 28)	Dez McCarthy	Gary Parker	15 April 2006	7.30
Luke is refereeing a charity football match and is impressed by one of the teenage players, Sol Lakley. Sol and his friend Mags later fall through a roof into a changing room, trapped by a fire caused by a discarded cigarette. Luke climbs down and stays with the pair until Josh and Nina arrive. Mags later collapses and Sol admits he drank industrial solvent. Sol is a refugee from Sierra Leone and Luke offers to train him without the consent of his uncle Amadou. An eccentric pet shop owner injures his leg climbing a fence to retrieve a ferret. Charlie and Maggie matchmake between him and his assistant. Maggie receives romantic e-mails which Alice realises are from Charlie's account. Maggie goes to ask him out but realises he knows nothing about the messages. A man who collapsed at work turns out to have had pectoral implants fitted to impress his fitness obsessed girlfriend; he ends up breaking up with her, realising she won't accept him for who he is. Ellen tries to hide the effects of her chemo while Kelsey gives her a hard time. Her day isn't improved when Abs asks her for a divorce, annoying Nina. Guest starring Jumayn Hunter, Alexander Morton and Amy Searles
529	35	"Lost and Found"	Dominic Lees	Katie Hims	22 April 2006	6.55
A woman who has been waiting in a café for three hours confronts the chef and his girlfriend shortly before the chef has a heart attack. It transpires she is his estranged wife: He walked out on her and their young daughter twenty years ago and was unaware his daughter drowned at a young age. Both of them are happy with their new lives and partners and resolve to divorce without a fuss. Luke gets Sol an unofficial job cleaning ambulances but is upset when he lets his friends break into an ambulance while everyone else is out. Brothers Craig and Fitz are working at a supermarket with a girl, Samia. Craig sees a poisonous spider in a box of fruit and insists he needs to go to hospital even though there is no evidence he was bitten. Fitz and Samia catch the spider but not before Fitz is bitten. Alice identifies it as a Brazilian wanderer and the correct antivenom is given. Samia turns Craig down to go out with Fitz. Charlie receives an e-mail, apparently from Maggie, and asks her out: It is her 40th birthday. Charlie finds out Louis sent the e-mails and Maggie ends up cancelling to meet Steve. He is moving to Malaysia and wants the children to join him for a year, unaware Maggie has not spoken to Jamie in months. A young woman is rescued from the water near a pier wearing a wedding dress. She initially goes along with Kelsey's theory that she is a jilted bride but Ellen realises the dress doesn't fit her. She admits she is pregnant by a stranger she met at her mother's funeral and went to the pier where her mother's ashes were scattered wearing her wedding dress to contact her spirit for advice. She convinces her father that by refusing to let her mother's death change anything he hasn't let them deal with it. Ellen admits to Nina she is being admitted to hospital for a week for aggressive chemotherapy and gets Nina to cut her hair off. Guest starring John Straiton, Joanne Howarth and Michelle Grant
530	36	"No Way Back"	Deborah Paige	Jonathan Rich	29 April 2006	7.70
A vanload of Asian workers arrive at a factory and the owner, Guang, insists on putting them to work without any training. He is hoping to set up his daughter Zhen in an arranged marriage but, while showing her intended's fiancé around the factory, the new workers spill rice and start a fire, injuring a kitchen hand. Guang's assistant Lok risks himself to get Zhen to safety and he is badly burned when he and Guang go back in to rescue the others. Zhen is horrified that her father hired a group of illegal immigrants to impress the visitors and tells him she wants to be with Lok; Guang gives his approval. It is the last day of Alice's four week trial and she is unlikely to be kept on. She impresses by realising that a misunderstanding of his culture's naming conventions saw Lok's notes misfiled and he is allergic to muscle relaxants. Sam helps her convince Tess to keep her on. A young woman comes in with an inflamed vagina. Guppy and Kelsey discover she and her boyfriend recently had sex for the first time and neither knew the other was a virgin. The girl assumes she has an STD but in fact she is allergic to latex and the couple smooth over their differences. Nina visits Ellen in oncology. Jamie comes in and turns out to have a chest infection. Maggie tells him and Joanne about Steve's offer and they decide to go. Guest starring David Yip, Angela May and Tony Wu
531	37	"A Problem Halved"	Jill Robertson	Nazrin Choudhury	6 May 2006	7.07
Luke and Comfort are plagued by a number of hoax calls. After staking out the call box where they came from, Luke discovers Sol is responsible but agrees to give him another chance. A woman dismisses calls from her surgery and tries to buy painkillers before being involved in a minor car accident. She is sent home from hospital after having her wrist plastered but then falls down the stairs. It eventually transpires that she was told her unborn baby has died but went into denial, not telling her husband or doing anything about it. Abs stumbles across Ellen in Oncology and agrees to keep quiet about it, supporting her and Nina. A teenage girl is upset to learn her bully has slept with the boy she had an unfulfilling sexual experience with and suffers a fall on a school abseiling trip. Maggie learns her parents haven't told her she has PAIS, meaning her internal organs are male, but convinces her with hormone therapy and reconstructive surgery she can live a full female life. Nathan announces a new consultant is being appointed. His favoured candidate is John Morecambe but both Harry and John insist on the proper recruitment process and Harry tells Maggie he'd be happy for her to apply. Guest starring Rachael Cairns, Rupert Holliday-Evans and Katherine Dow Blyton
532	38	"Secrets and Lies"	Steve Kelly	Sian Evans	13 May 2006	7.68
A faith healer, Martin, is conducting a service. Gerry, a man left in a wheelchair by a car accident, attends with his disbelieving boyfriend Bill but fails to be healed. A fire breaks out and Martin's pregnant wife Jo suffers breathing problems. Martin believes he cured her of porphyria but Charlie realises she merely went into remission because of lifestyle changes. Martin is disgusted by the homophobic attitude of a church member and the fact church leader John knew the healing didn't work, cutting ties with them. Gerry reveals he was going to leave Bill before he had his accident (the man killed in it was his lover) and is going to stay with his brother; he throws himself off a trolley when Nathan refuses to let Maggie admit him. A man with a lacerated face claims to be a career criminal and regales Kelsey with stories of his smuggling exploits but Selena realises he was actually attacked by a seagull. Amadou drags Sol to school when he catches him wagging but Luke gets him a trial with Holby United. Ellen collapses while out shopping and Josh and Nina have to take her to Holby. Tess and Abs try to hide her in a cubicle but Kelsey thinks it is a celebrity patient and enlists Sam and Alice to sneak a look. The news is soon spread around the department but Harry doesn't know until he walks in on her. After initially being angry, he promises her she's not alone. Guest starring Rob Collier, Fred Ridgeway and Kate Harrell
533	39	"Target Man"	Shani S. Grewal	Stephen McAteer	27 May 2006	6.23
Guppy and Kelsey look after a woman who had a wardrobe fall on her during a passionate encounter with her boyfriend: They have been rough which each other because she doesn't believe in sex before marriage. Although Guppy, who is a virgin, approves, Kelsey convinces her to chance her stance and they apparently consummate their relationship in the cubicle, while Kelsey teases Guppy that Nathan fancies him. Even though it is the day of Sol's football trial, he is convinced to join Reuben and another friend, Cam, in breaking into the home of drug dealer Frankie. A run-in leads to Cam being stabbed and Frankie having his arm stamped on, with the boys fleeing with a bag full of money and drugs. Sol calls Luke and Comfort for help but Reuben ends up holding them all at gunpoint and getting them to drive him to a meeting with Frankie and his boss Louise to sell the drugs back.Sol eventually hits the ambulance's panic button, leaving Josh, Nina and the police searching for them. The meeting results in Reuben and Frankie being shot and Comfort getting glass in her eye when the windscreen is shot at, with Sol causing Louise's car to crash by throwing the drugs over the windscreen. They make it to hospital where Reuben dies in Resus, although Cam recovers. Sol announces he wants to go back to his mother and friends in Sierra Leone. Luke decides to go with him to continue coaching him, resigning from the service. Guest starring Antony James, Robert Lowe and Freddie Annobil-Dodoo This episode sees the departure of Paramedic, Luke Warren
534	40	"All at Sea"	Ben Morris	Johanne McAndrew and Elliot Hope	3 June 2006	6.79
An elderly man comes home to find his kitchen on fire and is injured by a backblast. A young man who was at the house later causes trouble at a supermarket and is injured in an altercation with a security guard. It transpires he is the older man's grandson, who has stopped taking his medication for paranoid schizophrenia. He ends up throwing himself off a balcony and is admitted for psychiatric care. A woman is brought in after collapsing on her hen night and it transpires she and her friends have all been taking diet pills. Kelsey tells one of the friends that Guppy is a virgin and she tries to seduce him in a cubicle, being interrupted by Alice. Ellen returns to work but feels faint. Abs suggests some herbal therapies. Interviews are held for the consultant's job, where Harry points out John's research projects mean he won't be able to give the department as much time, and Maggie criticises hospital targets as short-term gain with long-term consequences. Harry later tells Maggie she has the job. Guest starring David Hargreaves, Graham O'Mara and Andrea Green
535	41	"Abide With Me"	Chris Lovett	Peter Mills	10 June 2006	6.50
It is Maggie's first day as consultant and also the first day for paramedic Greg Fallon. He tells Nina that the friend he was meant to be staying with disappeared, leaving him to deal with an angry landlord and the friend's dog. A woman who died of cancer is being buried by parents Mick and Linda, husband Rob and daughter Rachel; Rob and Rachel are due to emigrate to South Africa after the funeral. A boy, Jimmy, steals a van and crashes it into the funeral procession, injuring Rob. Desperate to keep Rachel with her, Linda first tells Rob that Rachel isn't his, then tells Rachel that Rob is dead and tries to run off with her. Mick stops her, calling her controlling. Rob agrees to them looking after Rachel until he gets out of hospital. Jimmy calls an ambulance on finding his mother has taken a heroin overdose, then runs off. His mother dies but Greg tracks Jimmy down and gives him the dog to look after. Abs learns Ellen missed a chemotherapy appointment and Harry has a talk to her. A wheelchair-using man, Chris, takes a series of complaints to Nathan, then gets into a fight after graffitiing cars who parked in disabled spaces in the car park, but does manage to get a date with Alice. Nathan tells Harry that the funding for Maggie's locum position no longer exists, and forces him to break the news to her. Guest starring Paul Copley, Lindy Whiteford and Julia Joyce This episode sees the arrival of Paramedic, Greg Fallon
536	42	"Silent Ties"	Darcia Martin	Jo O'Keefe	17 June 2006	6.16
A teenage boy, Joey, runs away from home with his deaf friend Vinna. They hide in a farm house but the floor gives way. Vinna staggers from the scene and flags down a truck driver. Maggie is called to the scene to treat Joey, who is buried under rubble, and Vinna, who collapsed out of sight, attracts Greg's attention by banging on a tractor. Joey believes he killed his abusive mother with a combination of anti-depressants and whiskey but she survived and is at the hospital. Maggie promises to help him. Ellen encourages Abs and Nina to get back together. Abs learns Adrian, a rugby player who turns out to have herpes, went out with Kelsey the previous night. Although they didn't sleep together, Kelsey elects not to see him again when he doesn't tell her. An elderly woman is brought in after collapsing at home. Her husband, a former GP, believes she has multiple sclerosis and it transpires he has been treating her at home despite being struck off for incompetence and negligence. In fact, she has sarcoidosis and has developed pneumonia, dying in Resus. Nathan suddenly announces there is funding for a specialist position and, despite learning of his treatment of Maggie, Selena decides to apply. Guest starring Aaron Johnson, David Sands and Gillian Axtell
537	43	"Needle"	Nic Phillips	Danny McCahon and Steve Lightfoot	22 July 2006	6.23
Tess is bothered by the rubbish piling up in the department as a result of a new cleaning contract and Selena's promotion is announced. A girl whose mother is having dialysis is hanging out with the hospital DJ, who she seems to see as a father figure. He leaves her alone with the DJ equipment but water, caused a blocked toilet, leaks onto the DJ equipment and ultimately causes her to be electrocuted by the DJ equipment. The DJ later uses his equipment to help mother and daughter talk to each other from their respective hospital beds and agrees to go for a movie with them when they get discharged. A woman, Joanne, brings a wardrobe down on herself and tells her husband Alan she was leaving him: She feels he doesn't find her attractive since she had a mastectomy. Alan slips on water, from the blocked toilet, he is knocked out and is left in there when Alice puts up an Out of Order sign without checking it is empty. Jacko, an HIV positive heroin addict who was hit by a car, finds him after sneaking in there to shoot up and alerts the staff but not before relieving Alan of his wallet. Alan and Joanne reconcile. Adrian makes a complaint to Tess about Abs and Kelsey breaking patient confidentiality. Tess chastises the pair but gets Adrian to drop the complaint by threatening to report him as a public health risk. An old man, Wilf, who has terminal prostate cancer, asks not to be resuscitated. Not wanting him to die alone, Kelsey calls an old army colleague, George. Wilf is distressed: He was charged as a deserter after fleeing under fire and leaving George to die. George says he would have run too if he hadn't been wounded and sits with Wilf as he dies. Tess learns Nathan told the cleaning contractor, Carl, to leave the ED alone and gets Carl to report directly to her. Nathan petulantly tries to empty a bin himself but pricks himself on a needle, just as Jacko is brought in with a fatal overdose. Guest starring Abigail Hardiman, Martha Cope, Geoffrey Bayldon and George Sewell
538	44	"Perfect Day"	Rob MacGillivray	Gaby Chiappe	29 July 2006	6.97
Nathan insists on seeing his own doctor about the needlestick injury and tries to force Alice to give him a list of patients. Harry and Charlie admit to him they had an HIV patient in. A woman brings her son to the Hep B clinic claiming he is a drug addict. She then fakes a faint so the boy can steal some drugs. He ends up trying to escape through a ventilation shaft and falling through the ceiling onto Nathan. Charlie and Maggie realise his mother is he addict. Nathan uses the incident as an excuse to close down the clinic. A man is practising martial arts with his niece when she accidentally stabs him in the foot with a chop stick. Kelsey convinces him to take her to a proper club. Kelsey notices Greg is wearing mascara and tries to prove he is gay. Greg kisses Nina to show he's straight and explains he tests products for cosmetic companies to stop them testing it on animals. A young man, Jay, comes in after being beaten up: He has large debts. Another man, Gethin, buys a car for his fiance Myar and hides in the boot but Jay steals it, running over Myar in the process. Gethin rings Myar to tell her and Greg and Nina try to stop the car but a land rover goes into the back of it, injuring Gethin, before Jay drives off. Jay's creditor refuses to take the damaged car so he tries to dump it in the river, only then realising Gethin is in the back. Jay throws himself in front of the car to stop it and is badly injured. Gethin is reunited with Myar but Jay dies in hospital. Guest starring Spencer Burrows, Hywel Morgan and Sean Wilson
539	45	"Happy Hour"	John Dower	David Joss Buckley	5 August 2006	6.36
A couple, Jerry and Viv, prepare for the opening of their wine bar but Viv has been having an affair with the architect, Paul. A troublesome customer, Loz, pushes Viv over, causing her to cut herself. Jerry has a minor stroke at the hospital but he and Viv reconcile after he realises she would rather have a family than a business empire. A group of school leavers go to the bar including shy girl Natalie, who has been looked after by her grandmother sine her parents died. Another girl, Sadie, spikes her drink and she ends up taking an overdose of paracetamol. Guppy learns she has a genetic condition which means she gets drunk on a small amount of alcohol. Her grandmother Brenda admits she has always blamed Natalie's mother for the car crash even though her blood alcohol level was low and realises she had the same condition: She resolves to support Natalie going to college. Loz attacks Sadie, who pushes him down some stairs. He then harasses Comfort but Nina chases him off. Nathan is determined to find a scape goat for the needle stick and convinces Sam he was responsible, leading him to want to resign. Charlie, Maggie, Kelsey and Harry all confess responsibility, bringing the witch hunt to an end. Tess tells Sam that Mike is coming home. Guest starring Dominic Mafham, Jane Slavin and Pascal Langdale
540	46	"The Truth Game"	Craig Lines	Linda Thompson	12 August 2006	6.85
A young man, Jonathan, turns up after getting to a fight with his new stepsister's husband at his mother Lydia's wedding. Stepsister Ruth also disapproves of her father Ernie marrying Lydia. Jonathan goes back to the wedding and causes trouble by getting one of Ernie's old flames, Eileen, to seranade him and then starting a fight in which Ernie and Ruth are both injured, along with Eileen. DJ Dave takes Eileen to the hospital where his son Simon, who he has barely seen since breaking up with his mother, stages a fit to get attention. Tess is having a bad day after Sam refused to live with Mike again and moved in with Kelsey, so throws Dave out. He later sneaks back in to tell Simon he does want to see him but was worried about causing trouble by pushing the matter. Ernie is diagnosed with syphilis but he and Lydia reject their children's opinions and decide to go travelling together. Tess goes bowling with Selena and Maggie and gets chatted up by a friend of a friend, Carl, admitting she isn't sure she wants Mike back. Alice unsuccessfully invites Guppy to a gardening lecture. Nina invites staff over for a party without telling Abs or Guppy, then makes a pass at Greg before walking out. Guppy and Kelsey are left alone and share a kiss. Guest starring Peter Armitage, Lois Baxter and Gyuri Sarossy
541	47	"Last Orders"	Rupert Such	Jason Sutton	19 August 2006	7.13
Nina has moved in with Ellen. Guppy wakes up in bed with Kelsey. They try to avoid each other but end up being required to treat a young Brownie, who has fallen ill. It turns out she put on what her Brown Owl said were invisibility patches but are actually nicotine patches. Guppy and Kelsey accidentally get superglued together and she explains he fell asleep before they did more than kiss and she's happy to leave it like that. Tess goes to pick up Mike from the nursing home but he has romantic feelings for his nurse Rose and tells Tess he wants a divorce Tess turns up to work drunk and Abs covers for her. A woman is brought in after crashing her car; her girlfriend thinks she has a drink problem and she is in the early stages of liver failure. She agrees to get help but is worried that her girlfriend just wants someone to look after and ends the relationship. Ellen is provisionally given the all clear. An elderly fisherman, Tom, is taken out on the trawler by his young colleague Jerry, but the harbourmaster calls an ambulance when Jerry collapses. Harry and Maggie want to admit him but Tom believes he is dying and Jerry wants to help him die out on the water rather than in hospital. Nina helps Jerry smuggle Tom out. Josh tells Nina that Loz has made an official complaint against her so she will have to be suspended. Guest starring Richard Harrington, Malcolm Rogers and Rachel Isaac
542	48	"Get What You Deserve"	Brett Fallis	Ginnie Hole	26 August 2006	6.90
A young girl, India, is taken to a dog breeder, Martin, by her mother to choose a puppy for her birthday. However, Martin has received complaints about the poor health of the dogs he provides from a pet shop, and a dog gets loose and mauls India. Greg sees the condition the dogs are in and threatens to call the RSPCA. Martin gets his grandson Will to start a fire in the barn to get rid of the evidence, but this results in them both being trapped inside after the floor gives way. Nina is arguing with Josh at the ambulance station when the call comes in and follows him down there, ending up trapped in the barn with Will and having to intubate him until they and the surviving dogs are rescued. Nathan is panicking about a visit from new executive director Richard Bardon. Harry and Guppy treat Lucille, an overweight woman who had a fall and learn she was refused a knee replacement until she lost four stone and has been moved to a secondary list to create the illusion of waiting lists being shorter. Her husband Ned is openly having an affair with her sister Lauren, who refuses to let him leave Lucille. Lucille later dies in Resus and Nathan's attempt to crack down on the argument sees Harry resign as medical director. Nathan humiliates himself further in front of Richard by trying to shut down a party Maggie organised for India. Nathan later tells Selena he is HIV positive, having slept with an infected woman years ago. Harry throws a party to celebrate Ellen getting the all-clear. Kelsey gets Alice glammed up to impress Guppy, but she leaves upset on hearing about Guppy and Kelsey spending a night in the same bed. Nina tells Josh she is resigning anyway and says goodbye to her friends. Guest starring Tony Haygarth, Cheryl Fergison and Gary Webster This episode sees the resignation of Technician, Nina Farr
