= Abs Denham =

Fictional character from the BBC medical drama Casualty

- Casualty character
- James Redmond as Abs Denham
- First appearance: "Flash in the Pan"; 4 October 2003
- Last appearance: "Too Old for This Shift"; 27 August 2016
- Portrayed by: James Redmond

In-universe information
- Occupation: Mental Health Nurse
- Spouse: Ellen Zitek (2004−2006)
- Significant other: Nina Farr
- Relatives: Sheila (mother); Danny (brother)

John "Abs" Denham is a fictional character from the BBC medical drama Casualty, played by actor James Redmond. He first appeared in the series eighteen episode "Flash in the Pan", broadcast on 4 October 2003. Abs was introduced at a time producer Mervyn Watson had revamped the show's cast. Redmond was offered the role of Abs which he was happy to accept because he was "fascinated" with the psychology of the character. Abs is characterised as being a "charming but eccentric loner".He is also portrayed as very "gullible", which writers took advantage of during his first relationship stories. They paired him with paramedic Nina Farr (Rebekah Gibbs), but soon added her scheming step-sister Ellen Zitek (Georgina Bouzova) into the story. Ellen realises that Abs is gullible and concocts lies to convince him to marry her so that she can obtain a visa to remain in the United Kingdom. He risked prison when he realised the marriage was a sham and ended it.

Producers later explored the character's backstory which included a prison sentence for causing a car accident while joy-riding. The accident left his brother Danny paralysed and alcohol-dependent which would lead to his death. They also introduced his childhood friend Stacey Merrick (Andrew Newton-Lee) who is an alcoholic. Writers used the story to make the character more ambitious as he tries to open an alcohol support clinic. In 2008, Redmond decided to leave Casualty. In the build up to his departure his producers killed off Stacey which caused Abs' life to "spiral out of control". He left during the episode titled "There and Back Again", which was broadcast on 18 October 2008. Redmond returned for one episode in 2016 to celebrate the show's thirtieth anniversary. The character has also been featured in two special episodes set in Cambodia.

== Casting ==
In April 2003, it was announced that Redmond had joined the cast of Casualty. Abs was billed as a new nurse who would both charm and aggravate colleagues with his "laid-back attitude." Redmond was happy to be offered the role because Casualty was filmed in his home town of Bristol. The actor said he was excited to join the show and revealed his first scenes would air in October 2003. Redmond believed that the character was very different to any role he had played before. He found this a main factor in being attracted to the role, he was also "fascinated" with the psychology of Abs. The actor had previously worked alongside head of BBC drama Mal Young and he believed this helped him secure the role. A reporter from the Bristol Post said that Casualty producers had wanted to include more actors with West Country accents, such as Redmond, to make the show appear more authentic. He was also introduced at a time producer Mervyn Watson had largely revamped the show's characters.

== Development ==
=== Characterisation ===
"Abs is an interesting character, I've got a bit of my own that I can draw on because he was a bit of a tearaway, in trouble with police and in a young offenders institution - I wasn't! He's a bit nuts himself, a bit tricky to get on with and a bit of a loner."

— Redmond on his character's persona.(2003)

Abs is characterised as a "charming but eccentric loner" and a "sensitive soul" On the show's official website, Abs is described as being "driven and passionate" towards his career and does not "suffer fools gladly". He is ready to shout at anyone being negative to him and he does not "sugar coat" the truth. The emergency department know they cannot cope without Abs' skills because he is the only nurse available with his skill set. He has also been called "principled, gullible, sensitive, jokey, empathetic" and someone "who goes his own way and loves probing people and solving their problems." His "kind and gullible" nature have made him an easy target to con.

The character was employed at the hospital as a F grade Mental Health Nurse. Abs was billed as an "oddball nurse". His role within the wards was welcomed by Redmond who had experiences with psychologists and psychiatrists when growing up. He believed Abs was a "fantastic" role to take on because it helped to raise awareness of mental health issues and make it less taboo. A Casualty publicist told Nicola Methven from the Daily Mirror that "Abs doesn't suffer fools gladly, but he is fixated by idiots and lunatics. His character is an interesting blend of vivacity, charm and genius."

=== Marriage to Ellen Zitek ===
The show began developing a relationship between Abs and paramedic Nina Farr (Rebekah Gibbs). Her sister Ellen Zitek (Georgina Bouzova) was introduced into the series and comes between the two characters. Ellen, who is from Ukraine, asks Abs to marry her so she can stay in the UK after her visa runs out. Discussing the development, Gibbs told Lucy Lawrence from the Daily Mirror that the storyline would create "amazing" scenes between Abs, Nina and Ellen. Ellen manages to convince Abs to marry her by concocting a story about her father abusing her. Bouzova told a reporter from Inside Soap that her character thought Abs "was a bit of a hunk" when they first met. As the pair got to know each other, Ellen realised she could target him. Bouzova explained that "she realised he's a walkover, so she takes him for a ride. The fact that he's her stepsister, Nina Farr's boyfriend is even better." She added that Ellen always wants what Nina has and decides to steal Abs.

Ellen later reveals that she has debts and loan sharks are after her. Abs is faced with the task of helping her gather the money together. But he faces a dilemma when he considers stealing from a patient and Nina is forced to stop him. Abs is shocked when he discovers that Ellen has lied about her father abusing her. He realises that she tricked him into marrying her just for a visa. Ellen tries to convince Abs that she has genuinely fallen in love with him and wants their marriage to work. Abs refuses to listen believing the marriage to be a sham and throws her out into the street. In episodes airing in February 2005, Abs decides that he wants to end the marriage officially. He threatens to report Ellen to immigration even though he knows it will probably see him end up in prison. A reporter from Inside Soap revealed that not even Nina declaring her love for Abs changes his mind. Abs threats causes a stressed Ellen to make a mistake at work which harms a patient. Despite this, he refuses to rethink his decision.

=== Cambodia episodes ===
The show planned two special episodes set in Cambodia to commemorate Casualty's twentieth anniversary. Redmond was one of five cast members who travelled to the country to film the episodes. In the storyline the team go to help Lisa Duffin (Cathy Shipton) on a medical mission. The cast filmed on various locations around the country. Martina Laird (who plays Comfort Jones) told Steve Hendry from the Sunday Mail that they had to work in "extreme conditions" where facilities were rather sparse. They also had to contend with high temperatures. It was also the rainy season and on one occasion they had to be evacuated after their location became a flood risk. The crew needed to cram in as much filming during daylight hours as possible. This meant 4.30 AM starts, first attending hair and make up and then going to the location shoots with long days on set.

=== Brother's death ===
In 2008, producers decided to explore Abs' back story which revealed he had not always been the kind and caring character they had portrayed him as. The story begins when Abs learns that his brother Danny has died. He later attends his funeral where it is revealed that Abs used to be a teenage tearaway. Danny died from complications caused by alcohol abuse. His alcohol abuse stemmed from the fact he was left paralysed after a car crash caused by Abs while joy-riding. Abs was convicted for his crime and sent to prison. This led to his family abandoning him and when he was released he tried to change his life. Redmond told Sarah Ellis from Inside Soap that "Abs and Danny were very close in their teens." The accident caused them to become estranged. He explained that "Abs never apologised for causing his brother's injuries, Danny was always the good kid, while Abs got himself into trouble." He added that Abs was to blame and that the accident brought on Danny's drink problem which eventually led to his death. His parents blame Abs for their son's death and refuse to have any contact.

Producers then introduced Abs' childhood best friend Stacey Merrick (Andrew Newton-Lee). Abs and Stacey both followed the same lifestyle as teenagers, but Abs is shocked to realise Stacey has not changed. Redmond revealed that "Stacey's very funny, the life and soul of the party." He then learns Stacey is an alcoholic which unsettles Abs because "he doesn't expect his mate to still be acting like that so many years on. He realises the booze is a huge problem." Stacey gets so drunk that Abs has to take him to hospital.

Producers used the story to take Abs in a more ambitious direction as he aspires to open an alcohol support clinic. Redmond explained that Abs knows the effect alcohol-related admissions has on the NHS and he wants to change that. He wants to sort the problem and "just feels that he should act." In addition, Abs knows that the clinic could help Stacey and serve as an honour to Danny's memory.

=== Departure and return ===
Redmond considered leaving Casualty in 2007, but his friends convinced him to stay longer because audition opportunities for other roles had dwindled. The actor decided to sign an additional one-year contract with the show. On 22 July 2008, Redmond announced his decision to leave the show. It was revealed that his character would make his final appearance during the seventh episode of twenty-third series titled, "There and Back Again" (which aired on 18 October 2008.) An Inside Soap reporter revealed that Abs "spirals out of control" in the build up to his departure. Producers killed off his best friend Stacey and he tries to avoid going to his funeral. He manages to conjure up the courage to attend where Stacey's girlfriend Ellie Bridges (Sarah-Jane Potts) is grateful for his support. Ellie convinces Abs continue to proceed with the alcohol support clinic. He discovers that the hospital have withdrawn its funding and he causes trouble on the ward. He is then arrested for being drunk and disorderly.

Abs' final episode saw him spending the night in a police cell with cuts and bruises. He then returns to work for his final shift and is forced to treat an escaped prisoner. His colleagues organise a surprise leaving party for him. He later leaves the show alongside his friend Ellie. Reflecting on his time on Casualty Redmond stated "Casualty was great because I really had to stretch myself as an actor. There was no comedy in my part - it was all drama, lots of shouting and medical stuff."

In 2016, Redmond agreed to return to the show in a guest appearance. Abs' returned alongside various former characters to celebrate Casualty's thirtieth anniversary episode titled "Too Old for This Shift", which was broadcast on 27 August 2016.

== Reception ==
Dawn Collinson from the Liverpool Echo branded Redmond a "Casualty heart-throb". The story involving Abs, Nina and Ellen was not well received by the Daily Mirror's Polly Hudson. She moaned "Casualty The Abs/Ellen/Nina triangle is ludicrous - and now dull, too." Tom Adair of The Scotsman branded opined that Abs marrying Ellen so she could obtain a visa was "limp" story telling. Jim Shelley from Daily Mirror branded Abs a "bizarre character" who "insists on dressing the like a scarecrow" who needed to wash his hair. They also described him as "handsome and ostensibly one of the more intelligent nurses in the series - which, admittedly, is not saying much." He then compared him to Benny Hawkins, a character the British soap opera Crossroads, but with the added "power of sectioning people." A writer from the Wexford People their episode in which Abs attempts to end his sham marriage with Ellen in their "one to watch" feature.
