= Zitek =

Zitek is a surname. Notable people with the surname include:

- Ellen Zitek, character from the BBC medical drama Casualty
- Josef Zítek (1832–1909), Czech architect
- Václav Zítek (1932–2011), Czech opera singer
