= Tess Bateman =

Fictional character from the BBC medical drama Casualty

- Casualty character
- First appearance: "End of the Line (Part 1)"; 13 September 2003
- Last appearance: "Remember Me, Part Two"; 11 December 2021
- Portrayed by: Suzanne Packer
- Spin-off(s): "Mistletoe and Rum" (2012)
- Duration: 2003–2016, 2021

In-universe information
- Occupation: Ward sister; (prev. emergency nurse practitioner, clinical nurse manager)
- Spouse: Mike Bateman (until 2006)
- Significant other: Adrian "Fletch" Fletcher
- Children: Sam Bateman (son); Saskia Bateman (daughter)
- Relatives: Charlie Bateman (grandson)

Tess Bateman is a fictional character from the BBC medical drama Casualty, played by Suzanne Packer. She first appears in the series eighteen episode "End of the Line (Part 1)", originally broadcast on 13 September 2003. The character is introduced as an emergency nurse practitioner in the emergency department (ED) of Holby City Hospital, but was later promoted to clinical nurse manager. For the role, Packer relocated from New York City to her hometown of Cardiff, and commenced filming in April 2003. Tess is characterised as a "traditionalist" with a good work ethic. She is highly experienced in her field and will protect her staff at all times. Packer drew on her experience as a teacher and her mother's experience as a nurse to develop the character.

The character develops friendships with Charlie Fairhead (Derek Thompson) and Abs Denham (James Redmond). Producers introduced Tess's family – husband Mike Bateman (Louis Emerick) and son Sam Bateman (Luke Bailey) – to the series. Packer and Emerick had previously portrayed a married couple on Brookside and had a natural connection. The family's plots feature the breakdown of Tess and Mike's marriage and Sam's bipolar disorder. Writers have involved Tess in dangerous situations. On one occasion, she was drugged and held at knifepoint by Sam's girlfriend, Fleur Butler (Laura Donnelly), and on another, she became impaled on a metal girder after clashing with a teenage patient.

One of the character's later stories saw her have an affair with married nurse Adrian "Fletch" Fletcher (Alex Walkinshaw), a story which played out over two years. The story concludes with Fletch's exit after Tess is involved in a train crash. Packer quit the show in 2015 and Tess departs in the series twenty-nine episode "Forsaking All Others – Part One", originally broadcast on 22 August 2015. The actress reprised her role for a cameo appearance in the show's thirtieth anniversary episode "Too Old for This Shift", first broadcast on 27 August 2016. Packer returned again in 2021 for a two-part Christmas special. For her portrayal of Tess, Packer won the 2006 Screen Nation Award for Female Performance in television. The character has received a mostly positive response from critics, with a reporter from The Telegraph including her in the show's ten best characters.

== Casting ==
On 24 April 2003, it was announced that actress Suzanne Packer had joined the cast as Tess Bateman, an emergency nurse practitioner (ENP) in the emergency department (ED) of Holby City Hospital. Packer attended an audition for the role, where she was offered the part. The actress liked the security the regular role of Tess offered her. Packer began filming in April 2003 and for the role, she relocated from New York City to her hometown Cardiff, where her family are based. The actress had given birth to her son, Paris, in December 2002, so she enjoyed being near her family again. Her parents were able to help her with babysitting while she filmed Casualty in Bristol. Having recently given birth, Packer suffered from "nappy brain", stemming from sleep deprivation and causing her to struggle with learning lines. Where she would previously isolate herself so she could learn her scripts, she could not do this with a baby.

Packer had previously guest starred on Casualty in 1995 as a patient who was nearly killed. As this character, the actress was involved in a water stunt. The actress's mother was a nurse, so Packer would often ask her for advice on the medical terminology used in the script. The actress had to overcome her squeamishness for the role. Her mother's job meant that she never watched Casualty, but since joining the drama, she began watching it. In an interview with BBC Online, Packer explained that she felt pressure to maintain the standard of the show. After three years in the role, Packer expressed her enjoyment at playing the role of Tess. She told Claire Brand of Inside Soap that her character has suffered "a lot of trauma" and hoped that she would get a "reprieve soon".

== Development ==
=== Characterisation ===
Tess is characterised as "a traditionalist" who wants to maintain standards that she was taught in nursing college. She is billed as "quite old school [and] quite strict". She is a highly experienced nurse who knows how to handle others. Her appearance as "a kill-joy and inflexible" can cause her to appear like "a bit of a stiff" to the younger members of her team. However, Tess wants to protect her staff and will be there for them in "their darkest hour". Packer thought Tess's work ethic worked as she would get good results with little errors. She added that Tess's experience has proven that this is the best way to achieve the results and that she does not want to "make people's lives a misery". Packer did not believe that Tess was a "bossy" person and instead thought that she "wants everyone to do their best", so reminds them. The actress drew on her experience as a teacher for this aspect of Tess's personality.

While Packer did not always agree with Tess's opinions and worried that she was too "harsh" on her staff, she believed she was realistic, which she had been told by real life nurses. She opined that this made Tess a "complex character". Despite her strict work ethic, Tess has a "wicked, dry, sense of humour". The character is also quite maternal; this led Packer to opine that Tess would choose nursing over becoming a doctor. Outside of her job, Tess is religious and regularly attends church, but does not advertise it. Her backstory states that she was raised in Cardiff and is a third generation Jamaican.

=== Introduction and family ===
The character is introduced as an emergency nurse practitioner, reflecting the rise in nurse practitioners being hired in NHS hospitals. Tess first appears in the first part of the series eighteen double episode "End of the Line", originally broadcast on 13 September 2003. In her first episode, Tess takes control of dealing with patients in the ED following news of a major incident, where a train has derailed and a tunnel has collapsed. Packer felt nervous on her first day of filming, but settled in quickly due to the friendly cast. She dubbed it "one of the easiest first days I have ever had". Tess establishes good relationships with clinical lead Harry Harper (Simon MacCorkindale) and clinical nurse manager Charlie Fairhead (Derek Thompson), but clashes with registrar Simon Kaminski (Christopher Colquhoun). In her early episodes, Tess fights to hire a mental health nurse, following an attack on nurse Roxy Bird (Loo Brealey). Consequently, Abs Denham (James Redmond) is hired and despite some initial setbacks, he wins Tess's approval. Packer believed that Abs exposed Tess's maternal nature as she struggles to be hard on him. The actress hoped the character would be used to explore topical issues facing nurses in the National Health Service (NHS).

Louis Emerick's casting as Tess's husband, Mike Bateman, was announced on 17 June 2003. Emerick revealed that he and Packer would appear in "a fantastic storyline, [which] we can really get our teeth into". Emerick was hired for four episodes. The pair previously portrayed a married couple on Brookside, and also worked together in the play Playboy of the West Indies in 1985, which was Packer's second acting role. The actors were excited to work with each other again and Packer felt their history aided their on-screen connection. Tess and Mike had been married for twenty years upon their introduction, and they share three children, including a son, Sam Bateman (Luke Bailey), and a daughter, Saskia Bateman. Tess and Mike are introduced in the same episode. Mike works at the scene of the accident as a fireman. He is suspended for negligence surrounding his work on the crash. Mike resigns from his job, causing Tess to worry about how they will cope financially. Tess secures him a minimum wage position as a hospital cleaner, while she becomes the department's acting clinical nurse manager, which Packer called "a pretty demanding and stressful job".

Sam is introduced to the show during series 19 as the new receptionist. Producers used the character to explore bipolar disorder, something Tess struggles to accept. Tess realises that Sam's behaviour is an issue after discovering him deleting patient files. She is "startled" by his distorted speech as he talks about how the information is "dangerous". Emerick also reprised his role during the series. Mike is surprised to learn about Sam's illness and is annoyed that Tess did not tell him. They argue and he "storms off", before being involved in a car crash, leaving him critically injured. Tess is "shocked" when Mike later files for divorce from her, and returns to work tipsy after a lunch break, prompting Abs to cover for her.

=== Drugging ===
At the beginning of the twentieth series, in September 2005, Fleur Butler (Laura Donnelly) is introduced as a love interest for Sam. Fleur has a personality disorder, which makes her "highly manipulative" and chaotic. Packer explained that Tess dislikes Fleur and feels "very suspicious" of her and her intentions towards Sam, mainly because she is a "naturally overprotective" mother. On Sam's birthday, Tess and Fleur make plans to celebrate. While Tess plans for a small house party, Fleur turns the house into a "full-scale nightclub". Packer pointed out that it was "a bit over the top for a house party". Tess tries to express her concerns, but Fleur dismisses her, worrying Tess. Packer told Brand (Inside Soap) that Fleur has a "possessive attitude" and acts like she is "the mum and its her home". Fleur calms down and offers Tess a glass of wine, which she has drugged. Tess then collapses and Packer noted that she has no knowledge about what is happening. She commented, "Tess is completely in the land of oblivion".

As Tess becomes unconscious, Fleur stands over her with a knife. Packer opined that Fleur is "completely unbalanced" and although she appears "happy-go-lucky", she is capable of serious things. The twist continues into the following episode as Sam returns home. Fleur claims that Tess is drunk and has passed out, but soon admits that she drugged her. She claims that Tess wants Sam sectioned and he needed protecting. Sam finds Fleur trying to strangle Tess and interjects. Fleur then grabs a knife, but they are saved when Abs and Nina Farr (Rebekah Gibbs) arrive at the party. Packer enjoyed filming the scenes as she did not have learn any lines and had to lie in a bed for two days. She joked that it was "one of the most relaxing episodes" she had ever filmed.

=== Impalement ===
In 2008, the character was involved in a stunt to mark the opening of the show's twenty-third series. The stunt took place over two episodes broadcast on consecutive nights with Tess's survival used as a cliffhanger between the episodes. When teenager Sammy Malone (Finn Atkins) is admitted to the ED, she clashes with Tess and wrecks her office, before fleeing. Tess is unimpressed and goes to find her on her break. Packer explained that Tess is "furious" and "wants to tell this girl exactly what she thinks of her". She finds Sammy at the local council estate and chases after her, ending up on a building site. Sammy refuses to talk to Tess, who slips and falls, becoming impaled on a metal girder. Sammy watches and does not help Tess; instead, she steals her phone and films her. As she runs away, Sammy is run over by an ambulance driven by Dixie Dixon (Jane Hazlegrove). Consequently, nobody knows where Tess is. Packer called this "a terrible twist".

Charlie becomes worried about Tess and discovers her phone with Sammy. After seeing the footage of Tess impaled, he and Big Mac (Charles Dale) head to the estate and try to find Tess. When they find her, they take her to the ED where Adam Trueman (Tristan Gemmill) treats her in resus, and saves her. A hydraulic system was used to perform the stunt. As Packer fell, the girder rose with them meeting in the middle. The actress opined that it was "very clever", but she found it "very uncomfortable". Packer spent seven hours suspended in the air while filming the impalement, which she struggled with. She told Sarah Ellis of Inside Soap that it "took every ounce of my muscle fibre to deal with that and not think about the discomfort".

=== Affair with Fletch ===
Alex Walkinshaw was introduced as staff nurse Adrian "Fletch" Fletcher in July 2012. Tess bonds with Fletch and Walkinshaw thought that Tess likes the humour he brings to the ED. Producers explored the relationship between the characters and it is developed into an affair across a long-running story. Walkinshaw opined that the story develops naturally and "just make[s] sense". He explained that the story pairs "two people you wouldn't expect", adding that Tess and Fletch share a mutual respect and understanding, and he relaxes Tess from her intensity of her position. The actor told Elaine Reilly of What's on TV that the story features "a lot of pain and struggle" for the characters. Packer and Walkinshaw enjoyed working together and discussed their scenes prior to filming them.

A special BBC Red Button episode, "Mistletoe and Rum", was commissioned as part of the story. It starts to explore Tess and Fletch's relationship, before it becomes a central plot in the show. As the team celebrates Christmas, Tess and Fletch spend time together, but discover Tyron, a homeless man who needs emergency treatment when he goes into a hypoglycaemic coma. The pair work together to save his life. Sunetra Sarker, who portrays Zoe Hanna, directed the special and praised the performances of Packer and Walkinshaw. She added that the special would be "a treat for all the fans".

Writers progressed the story after Tess is put in a vulnerable position. While jogging, she witnesses a stabbing and after dealing with the situation in the ED, she returns home, where she is physically threatened. Fletch arrives and protects her; they then have sex. Walkinshaw explained that Tess feels "scared and emotional" and in the moment, the pair acknowledge their feelings for each other. Tess later discovers that she is pregnant with Fletch's baby, but she has an abortion. The story was challenged by Fletch's marriage and his family, who were introduced to the series. Walkinshaw thought this was important to portray, so the audience can get "a clearer picture of the triangle". Claire Cage was cast as Fletch's wife, Natalie Fletcher. While visiting Fletch at work, she feels faint and is admitted into the ED. Tess treats her and discovers that she is pregnant. While Zoe suggests treating other patients, Tess wants to remain professional. However, she becomes distracted and administers another patient with the wrong medication, before leaving work. The error leaves the patient in danger.

The focus of the story shifts to Fletch and Natalie's marriage after Tess rejects him. When Fletch admits that he loves her, Tess denies feeling the same, so he decides to focus on his marriage. Natalie learns that Fletch has had an affair. He claims the woman was a nurse who has left the hospital and Tess supports his story. Walkinshaw told Reilly that Natalie would feel "really hurt and betrayed" if she discovered Tess's lies. Fletch is ejected from the family home, but an incident involving his daughter reunites them. Walkinshaw said that Fletch acknowledges the "massive problems" created by the affair. Tess encourages Natalie to forgive Fletch for his actions, which Walkinshaw thought was "obviously very difficult" for Tess to do.

Producers revisited the story as part of Fletch's departure from the series, which serves as the end of the story. Jonathan Phillips, the episode's producer, wanted his final episode to focus on his relationship with Tess. The episode is set around an explosion and train derailment. Series producer Erika Hossington explained that this was a conscious choice to include a regular character in the stunt as the audience enjoy this. The stunt was of a large scale and involved a train on its side, covered by debris, ladders and railway sleepers. It was filmed over multiple nights in cold weather. The crew struggled to find a location to film the stunt and visited many locations, but most of them were not suitable due to their size and logistics. Phillips wanted to create "a real spectacle" with the stunt. Despite the grandness of the stunt, Phillips wanted the affair to be "right at the heart of the episode" and ensured this was reflected in the script.

Tess is travelling on the train when it derails; Fletch learns this and rushes to help at the scene. Walkinshaw explained that in this moment, Fletch realises his true feelings for Tess. He thought that Fletch was "brave, stupid [and] romantic" by rushing into accident to save Tess. The actor told Reilly that although Tess and Fletch have tried to act as only friends, it would not work in the long-term, which is explored following the crash. Phillips opined that the episode should "create a sense of what's at stake for these two characters" with the pivotal moment being the characters reconnecting amidst a dramatic situation. He added that the characters are "forced to face their destinies together" and evaluate whether their future involves each other. Consequently, they agree they cannot continue as they are and Fletch quits his job. Walkinshaw explained that selflessly, Fletch "put Tess first". Writers used Fletch's departure to progress Tess's character as she deals with the aftermath of their affair. Hossington told Daniel Kilkelly of Digital Spy that Tess becomes "starchy and all about the work", which would have a negative impact on her team.

=== Departure and returns ===
Emerick revealed, via social media, in April 2015 that Packer had left Casualty, although the news was not confirmed by the show. Hossington later explained that the character's departure was not announced, in tradition with other cast exits. Tess departs in the series twenty-nine episode "Knock Knock Who's There?", first broadcast on 15 August 2015. Bailey reprised his role as Sam for the character's departure. In the narrative, Tess contacts Sam, who introduces her to his newborn son Charlie. Tess then decides to quit her job and move to Leeds to help Sam and Charlie. The character also appears in a cameo during the following episode. Following criticism that Tess's exit was "low-key", Hossington responded that character exits varied based on other storylines in the show as sometimes, it does not feel appropriate to portray big exit stories alongside other prominent stories. She also admitted that while Tess's exit appeared "underpowered in the moment on screen", it had further "repercussions" for other characters, such as Charlie and Zoe, two characters who were close to Tess. Packer reprised the role for another cameo appearance in the show's thirtieth anniversary episode "Too Old for This Shift", first broadcast on 27 August 2016.

In 2021, the show's producers invited Packer to reprise her role as Tess for a two episode Christmas special, airing as part of series 36. The character's return was officially confirmed by the show on 23 November 2021, although the news had been leaked through the actress's Spotlight CV prior to the announcement. The special, "Remember Me", was written by Barbara Machin and was originally broadcast on 4 and 11 December 2021. It explores Tess and Charlie's now-estranged friendship. Packer felt "delighted and very flattered" to be invited back to the show and revisit Tess, who she called "a legacy character" who means a lot to her personally. The actress was also pleased to work with Thompson and Holly Aird, who guest stars in the episodes, again under Machin's script. She dubbed it "a dream return". When asked about returning to the show again, Packer said that she would providing she was asked by producers and it worked with her other commitments. She opined that Casualty was "irreplaceable" and "a comfort blanket".

Since her departure, Tess has been supporting Sam and his son, Charlie. Packer told Elaine Reilly of What to Watch that Sam's mental health became worse which in turn impacted Tess's own mental health. She commented, "She's been drowning and surviving, and is only now starting to get her mojo back." Tess's return is set on Christmas Day 2020 in the midst of the COVID-19 pandemic when the ED is suffering a nursing shortage; she signs up for an agency shift at the hospital to assist. Packer noted that Tess is also keen to see her friends again, especially Charlie. However, Charlie is cold with her, leaving Tess "deeply hurt". It soon emerges that Charlie has a suspected brain tumour. Packer explained that Tess has been "so overwhelmed with her own situation" that she regretfully has not been aware of Charlie's situation. Writers did not want to end the pair's friendship so they are reunited before Tess leaves again. Packer commented, "Their deep respect and love for each other helps them to realise that no amount of resentment or misunderstandings can destroy their friendship."

== Reception ==
For her portrayal of Tess, Packer was awarded the 2006 Screen Nation Award for Female Performance in television. The actress was surprised to win the accolade and thought the drama's nomination reflected the production team's work. At the 19th National Television Awards in 2014, Packer was longlisted in the Drama Performance category for her role as Tess.

A reporter of The Telegraph included Tess in the ten best characters of Casualty. They wrote that "calm and firm" Tess "endured her fair share of drama". A Daily Post reporter dubbed Tess "sensible", while Christine Klabacher from the Warrington Guardian labelled her a "po-faced nurse". Emma Bullimore of the Radio Times called the character "lovely [and] responsible". In April 2020, she ranked her affair with Fletch sixth in the show's best romances. She called it "so-so-scandalous" and commented, "We shouldn't have been willing them to stay together, but we couldn't help it." The story garnered a mixed response and Walkinshaw told Laura-Jayne Tyler of Inside Soap that "It's like Marmite - people either love it or hate it." In 2012, Inside Soap described Tess and Charlie as "the mum and dad of Casualty". Producer Nikki Wilson recognised the characters' importance and highlighted their relationship, agreeing that they are the parents of the whole department". She hoped they would continue to feature in the show.

Tess's first episode was rated the best ever episode in an online poll ran by the show's website for its twenty-fifth anniversary in September 2011. In the same poll, the episode featuring the character's impalement was nominated. Tess's impalement story received criticism for its portrayal of council estates by Jules Birch of Inside Housing. Klabacher was not surprised that Tess survived her accident and dubbed the scene "a Tess kebab". The story also received complaints to Ofcom, who criticised the repeated use of "extreme scenes" aired pre-watershed. In a statement, they said that the scenes of Tess impaled, combined with a graphic car crash, led to "a sustained and concentrated run of distressing and shocking scenes". Tess's exit was included in The People's television highlights for 15 August 2015. Radio Times' Alison Graham criticised the realism of Tess leaving without a notice period. In March 2019, Sophie Dainty from Digital Spy expressed a wish for Tess to return to the show, which was echoed by series producer Loretta Preece in September 2019.
