= Casualty series 27 =

Twenty-seventh series of Casualty

Casualty
- Series 27
- Starring: Daniel Anthony; Matt Bardock; Oliver Coleman; Charles Dale; Gemma-Leah Devereux; Michael French; Jane Hazlegrove; Amanda Henderson; Tony Marshall; Michael Obiora; Azuka Oforka; Suzanne Packer; Charlotte Salt; Sunetra Sarker; Derek Thompson; Christine Tremarco; Alex Walkinshaw
- No. of episodes: 44

Release
- Original network: BBC One; BBC One HD
- Original release: 18 August 2012 – 20 July 2013

Series chronology
- ← Previous; Series 26 Next → Series 28

The twenty-seventh series of the British medical drama television series Casualty commenced airing in the United Kingdom on BBC One on 18 August 2012 and finished on 20 July 2013.

== Production ==
The series commenced in the United Kingdom on 18 August 2012 on BBC One and aired on Saturday nights. Nikki Wilson continues her role as series producer, while Johnathan Young serves as the executive producer. The BBC advertised for the role of executive producer at Casualty and Holby City on 15 February 2013. Two weeks later, it was announced that former series producer Oliver Kent had been appointed in the role and would commence work on 11 March 2013. Kent expressed her delight at his appointment, commenting, "I am inheriting two shows in great shape and I can't wait to get started." Kate Harwood, the Head of BBC Drama Production England, praised Kent and opined that he would be "a great new leader" for the dramas.

Episodes run for 50 minutes in length. Previous series have included feature-length episodes, but Wilson explained that the series would not use any feature-length episodes and would instead tell stories over two-part or three-part episodes. She opined that "stories are sustained so well over 50 minutes".

Viewing figures for the first episode were 5.19 million viewers, continuing to be one of the most watched programmes on a Saturday night.

== Cast ==
The twenty-seventh series of Casualty features a cast of characters working for the NHS within the emergency department of Holby City Hospital and the Holby Ambulance Service. Matt Bardock appears as Jeff Collier, a paramedic, and William Beck portrays Dylan Keogh, a consultant in emergency medicine. Oliver Coleman stars as Tom Kent, an emergency pediatrician, and Charles Dale features as Big Mac, a hospital porter. Jane Hazlegrove plays Kathleen "Dixie" Dixon, a paramedic and the operational duty manager at Holby Ambulance Service. Tony Marshall appears as Noel Garcia, a receptionist, and Michael Obiora portrays Lloyd Asike, a staff nurse. Suzanne Packer features as Tess Bateman, a sister and the department's clinical nurse manager. Charlotte Salt plays Sam Nicholls, a CT2 doctor, and Sunetra Sarker portrays Zoe Hanna, a consultant and the department's acting clinical lead. Original cast member Derek Thompson stars as Charlie Fairhead, a senior charge nurse. Christine Tremarco and Alex Walkinshaw appear as staff nurses Linda Andrews and Adrian "Fletch" Fletcher, respectively.

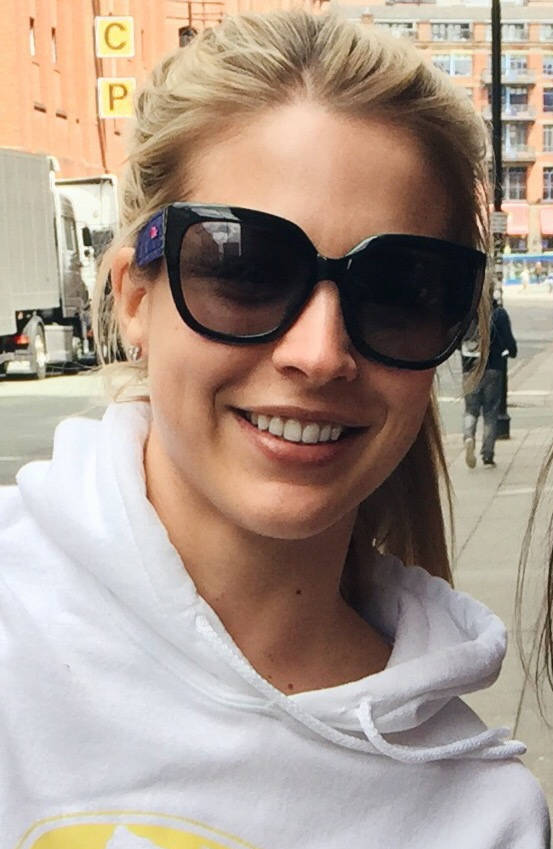
Gemma Atkinson reprised her role as Tamzin Bayle.

Gemma Atkinson reprised her role as paramedic Tamzin Bayle in the opening episode. The actress announced her return in May 2012. Producer Nikki Wilson confirmed that Tamzin would appear for a multi-episode story arc and depart at its conclusion. Kate McEvoy appears in a guest stint as cleaner Denise Andrews, the sister of Linda, at the start of the series. Devon Beigan and Taylor Parry also star as Denise's children, Britney Andrews and Joe Andrews, respectively. Tremarco enjoyed working with the trio and praised the children's professionalism. Azuka Oforka joined the regular cast in episode one as receptionist Louise Tyler, having previously appeared in a short stint during series 26.

Paul Bradley, who stars in sister show Holby City as Elliot Hope, appears in episode 7 for a scene with Big Mac. Wilson explained that they wanted to "give audiences that treat" by creating crossovers. Producers reintroduced Amanda Franks (Connie Fisher) for a guest stint in episode 11, following an appearance in series 26. Amanda works as a volunteer in the hospital shop and features in a story with Dylan. Beck left his role as Dylan in 2012 and the character departed in episode 16 at the conclusion of his story.

Wilson announced plans to introduce a group of student nurses to the series in July 2012. The show used their website and social media platforms to promote the characters and their introductions in episode 17. Gemma-Leah Devereux, Amanda Henderson, Daniel Anthony and Rebecca Newman were cast in the roles of Aoife O'Reilly, Robyn Miller, Jamie Collier and Ally Hunter, respectively. All four actors visited a real emergency department to prepare for the role. Newman was cast in a guest role and departed after two episodes, whilst Devereux departed in episode 33.

In January 2013, it was confirmed that Michael French, who portrays consultant Nick Jordan, would return for a four-episode stint, following a temporary departure at the end of the previous series. The return marks his official departure from the show and he exits in episode 22. As part of the return, Rachel Shelley reprised her role as Yvonne Rippon for two episodes, where her character was killed off. Following French's departure, it was announced that Patrick Robinson would reprise his role as Martin "Ash" Ashford, 17 years after he left the series. Ash, who was originally a nurse, returns to the ED as a consultant. Johnathan Young, the show's executive producer, expressed his joy at Robinson's return and hoped Ash's return would "delight viewers old and new". Tremarco departed her role as Linda in episode 35, followed by Obiora's exit from his role as Lloyd in episode 38.

=== Main characters ===
- Daniel Anthony as Jamie Collier (from episode 17)
- Matt Bardock as Jeff Collier
- William Beck as Dylan Keogh (until episode 16)
- Oliver Coleman as Tom Kent
- Charles Dale as Big Mac
- Gemma-Leah Devereux as Aoife O'Reilly (episodes 17−33)
- Michael French as Nick Jordan (episodes 18−21)
- Jane Hazlegrove as Kathleen "Dixie" Dixon
- Amanda Henderson as Robyn Miller (from episode 17)
- Tony Marshall as Noel Garcia
- Michael Obiora as Lloyd Asike (until episode 38)
- Azuka Oforka as Louise Tyler (from episode 1)
- Suzanne Packer as Tess Bateman
- Patrick Robinson as Martin "Ash" Ashford (from episode 22)
- Charlotte Salt as Sam Nicholls
- Sunetra Sarker as Zoe Hanna
- Derek Thompson as Charlie Fairhead
- Christine Tremarco as Linda Andrews (until episode 35)
- Alex Walkinshaw as Adrian "Fletch" Fletcher

=== Recurring characters ===
- Gemma Atkinson as Tamzin Bayle (episodes 1−15)
- Devon Beigan as Britney Andrews (until episode 7)
- Adrian Harris as Norman Burnton
- Kate McEvoy as Denise Andrews (until episode 7)
- Taylor Parry as Joe Andrews (until episode 7)
- Tahirah Sharif as Ella Ashford

=== Guest characters ===
- Gary Cady as Dominic Carter (episodes 14–16)
- Connie Fisher as Amanda Franks (episodes 11−14)
- Rebecca Newman as Ally Hunter (episodes 17−18)
- Rachel Shelley as Yvonne Rippon (episodes 18−19)

== Episodes ==
No. overall	No. in series	Title	Directed by	Written by	Original release date	UK viewers (millions)
824	1	"Kansas"	Nigel Douglas	Stephen McAteer	18 August 2012	5.19
With the Emergency Department reeling from the aftermath of the Holby Riots, Zoe takes on the role of Clinical Lead until the return of Nick. A local music festival puts thousands of music fans and her team in danger, resulting in some devastating consequences. Sam and Tom are out assisting in the emergency alongside paramedics Dixie, Jeff and Tamzin Bayle. When the festival stage goes up in flames and the crowd rush to safety, the collapse of the exit tunnel adds to the confusion and casualty list. Three of the more seriously injured are rushed to hospital. Zoe immediately faces a difficult decision when she has to make her first big decision as head of the department with the impossible choice of choosing which patient should get the remaining bed in ITU. Dylan insists his patient should get the bed as she has a better chance of survival. Sam notices when Tamzin asks if Tom is single. It transpires that fake tickets were sold at the festival. Note: Return of Tamzin Bayle (Gemma Atkinson) & Louise Tyler (Azuka Oforka)
825	2	"Cuckoo's Nest"	Nigel Douglas	Steve Bailie	25 August 2012	5.16
Jeff and Tamzin are called to the rescue of a baby who has been left unattended. Lucy's care until social services arrive is assigned by Zoe to Dylan, much to his concern; initially reluctant, he begins to enjoy the company of a baby, which is a surprise to everyone including himself. Lucy suddenly deteriorates and it is left to Tom to revive her, while Dylan starts to accuse her mother Taylor of inadvertently passing drugs to Lucy through her breast milk. When Tamzin becomes protective of Taylor, saying that she shouldn't be judged, Jeff begins to wonder just why she is so defensive. Sam treats a mystery man called Alan, who has lost his memory after being hit by car as he was chased from a house that he had broken into. She begins to piece together the puzzle and suspects that he is the long-lost son of the family who own the house. Jeff has more uncertainty about Tamzin following their attending to a lap dancer who has collapsed at work.
826	3	"Rock, Paper, Scissors"	Robert Del Maestro	Anita Pandolfo	1 September 2012	5.11
When a female cage fighter is wheeled into ED after collapsing at the gym, Sam immediately recognises her as her spar partner and friend Melanie. Keen to get back to the gym as quickly as possible to prepare for her championship fight, Melanie pushes Tom to the limit as she refuses to take his medical advice. Louise has a run in with another patient. After a tough day, Tom invites Sam for a drink, which turns into several and the pair kiss. Denise tells Fletch her sister's childhood nickname, much to the annoyance of Linda.
827	4	"An Amateur Sport"	Robert Del Maestro	Christian O'Reilly	15 September 2012	5.49
An exhausted taxi driver falls asleep at the wheel and crashes into a field; Jeff and Tamzin attend to Harry and his pregnant passenger, Georgia, and find themselves face to face with an angry bull. On hearing the news, Harry's daughter Sheena who is an aspiring swimmer, wants to join him at ED with her coach Tony, but ends up needing treatment herself, and not only for a fall. An awkward Tom and Sam face each other after the night before.
828	5	"I'll See You in My Dreams"	Jon Sen	David Bowker	22 September 2012	5.03
As a weather storm hits Holby, a family crisis reaches boiling point. After an argument with Louise, Big Mac is feeling isolated from the gang and thoroughly discontented. But when his long-lost friend Snapper is brought into the ED after being injured in the storm, Big Mac finds a cause he can get behind and tries to persuade his grumpy friend to have urgent surgery. Jeff and Tamzin bring in the Eldon family—Maria, Gray and daughters Maddy and Siana—Gray is treated for a fractured skull, leaving Tom, Jeff and Tamzin the puzzle of what has happened.
829	6	"Evolve or Be Extinct"	Jon Sen	Andrew Rattenbury	29 September 2012	4.66
As Ryan Bradshaw heads out to meet his girlfriend's daughter for the first time, he gets the shock of his life as an old acquaintance named Connor turns up at the same restaurant. While Ryan tries to remain calm, Connor makes a run for it, quickly ending up in the ED. Back in the ED, medical student Annie presents with a broken arm after a big night out. Meanwhile, Lloyd also spends the day suffering after Fletch shows him a night on the tiles.
830	7	"Tough Love"	Sallie Aprahamian	Ben Tagoe & Tony McHale	6 October 2012	4.88
As Linda struggles to come to terms with Denise's bombshell, she throws herself into treating Henry and Jules, a father and son injured in an accident at a warehouse. Meanwhile, the ED is alerted to a thief among its staff, with the finger pointed at Denise. Note: Final Appearance of Denise (Kate McEvoy), Britney (Devon Beigan) and Joe Andrews (Taylor Parry)
831	8	"The Kindness of Strangers"	Sallie Aprahamian	Kelly Jones	13 October 2012	4.80
Zoe tries to get used to the administrative side of her new role, but when a young girl named Ruby is brought into the ED following a car crash and is covered in scars from old injuries, Zoe spots an opportunity to do what she loves and misses – treat patients. Meanwhile, Big Mac returns to the ED following his heart attack, despite protests from Noel and Louise. Irritated to find that the ED has carried on fine without him, Big Mac spots an opportunity to help a patient, but finds his good intentions questioned by Dylan.
832	9	"Harvest Festival"	Graeme Harper	Sasha Hails	20 October 2012	5.13
As 7-year-old Bobby's condition quickly deteriorates, he is rushed into the ED by his parents Rob and Jenny. Zoe quickly recognises the symptoms and diagnoses a life-threatening case of E-coli known as Haemolytic Uremic Syndrome. As the ED team struggle to save Bobby's life, other children from Bobby's class are also brought into the ED with similar but lesser symptoms. Advised by the health authority to keep the E-coli outbreak a secret until the source is found.
833	10	"Seeing in the Dark"	Graeme Harper	Julie Dixon	27 October 2012	5.17
As patients flood the ED scared that they have been affected by the E-coli outbreak, Zoe stands firm on her decision to speak to the press. Determined to find the source, Zoe pieces together the puzzle, but can she alert the authorities before all evidence is destroyed? Elsewhere in Holby, a young worker Bart heads off on his motorbike to meet his girlfriend Bethan. Rather unsteady, he looks like he has never ridden the bike before, much to the amusement of his fellow workers. But as he continues to drive, he struggles to control the vehicle, creating a pile-up which, unbeknownst to Bart, has devastating results for Bethan. Meanwhile, after a long shift, the team finds some light relief when they don their fancy dress to head to a Halloween party. As Tom and Sam mess around in the staff room they kiss, but stop only to find that Dylan has entered the room.
834	11	"When Love Breaks Down"	Tim Leandro	Frank Rickarby	3 November 2012	5.03
Amanda returns to the ED, as a teenager struggles to kick a bad habit and a mother-to-be suffers a scare. As troubled teen Angel battles to find the money to pay her friend Christie, she knows time is running out and has to get it by any means possible. Spotting an opportunity with her uncle Spike she begs him for the cash, but unable to pay immediately Angel takes drastic measures, sending her uncle to the ED more than once. Meanwhile Anna is rushed to the hospital after suffering a possible heart attack, but she is more concerned about her baby. Amanda, who was previously saved by Dylan and Sam when a cave collapsed, returns to the ED with her unwell friend Helen. Happy to see Dylan, she plucks up the courage to ask him on a date. Encouraged by Sam, Dylan agrees, but then catches sight of Sam and Tom flirting. Note: Return of Amanda Franks (Connie Fisher)
835	12	"Out of the Blue"	Tim Leandro	Dana Fainaru	17 November 2012	4.70
Tamzin's refusal to treat a drunk and abusive patient has serious repercussions, while Tom, Sam and Dylan must all find a way to work together to treat a family with a rare genetic disorder. Professional footballer Jay is upset that his team lost, and as he drives home from the game, he throws his girlfriend Nicole out of the car onto the side of the road in a rage, only to return shortly after. Jay has been drinking, and as he drives the wrong way up the motorway, he crashes into an oncoming car. Jeff and Tamzin attend the scene, and as Jay's behaviour becomes more abusive, Tamzin makes a decision that could have devastating consequences for her career and friendship with Jeff. Meanwhile, Tom and Sam treat a patient with suspected Morquio Syndrome, and as they clash over the right course of treatment, Dylan reveals that he saw them kissing on Halloween.
836	13	"Sixteen Candles"	Jill Robertson	Katie Douglas	24 November 2012	4.67
As Caitlin enjoys her 16th birthday, the celebrations are brought to a sudden end when her mother Becky stumbles upon an intruder. Attacking him in self-defence, Becky is badly burnt and the mysterious intruder lies unconscious on the floor. Arriving in the ED, the father John recognises Tess, and as he struggles with a secret that threatens to tear his family apart, he confides in her. Seeing Tess struggle under the weight of what she knows, Fletch goes the extra mile to bring the family together again. Sam and Lloyd treat the intruder, but soon discover that their unknown male patient has a past that he doesn't want revealed to anyone. Elsewhere in Holby, heir hunter Wally tracks down Maggie, who is the reluctant recipient of her aunt's large will. Shocked by the news, she collapses and is rushed to the ED where her family's history comes back to haunt her.
837	14	"My Aim Is True"	Jill Robertson	Tom Needham	1 December 2012	4.65
Zoe and Fletch treat a young mother with Down's Syndrome, Meg, and her baby Amy following an accident at home. Later, accusations from an unlikely source that Meg isn't a fit mother begin to circulate as Amy struggles to breathe. Meanwhile, Tom is unnerved by the arrival of new locum consultant Dominic, whom he has worked with before. However, as Dominic proves himself an asset to the team, Tom keeps quiet about his concerns. Elsewhere, as Dylan's suspicions about Amanda deepen, he decides to attend the ED Christmas party, where the truth about Amanda is revealed. Note: Final Appearance of Amanda Franks (Connie Fisher)
838	15	"The Blame Game"	Steve Hughes	Kevin Rundle	8 December 2012	4.75
Tamzin and Jeff respond to a call-out to a shopping centre, where teenager Jodie has fallen from a height after running from security. As she is brought into the ED, Dominic and Tom argue over the best course of care, leading to a blow-up and Tom lashing out. Meanwhile, news reaches Tamzin that a legal case against the Ambulance Trust is being brought by ex-footballer Jay, whose neck she failed to immobilise. Having covered for her once, Jeff agonises over telling the truth. Note: Final Appearance of Tamzin Bayle (Gemma Atkinson)
839	16	"I Saw Mommy Killing Santa Claus"	Steve Hughes	Stephen McAteer	15 December 2012	5.74
As two parents argue, a car rolls into a freezing lake, trapping inside their children Connor and Mark. Back at the ED, the team attempt to resuscitate baby Mark but eventually new locum Dominic decides they can do no more. When Tom disagrees and takes over, Dylan is torn but eventually steps in to help Tom and between them they bring Mark back. With emotions running high, Dylan and Tom square up to each other outside the ED, much to Sam's horror, and Dylan finally admits to Zoe that he has not got over Sam. Note: Final Appearance of Dylan Keogh (William Beck).
840	17	"Rabbits in Headlights"	Jon Sen	Sasha Hails	5 January 2013	6.02
Ally, Robyn, Jamie and Aoife, four student nurses on their first day of work placement in ED, are quickly partnered with their mentors—Charlie, Linda, Lloyd and Fletch. A coach crash involving 30 children and their teachers determines that normal induction is abandoned as they are thrown in at the deep end. The students have the anguish experienced in an overwhelmed accident and casualty department first-hand—death, dealing with bereaved relatives, organ donation and patient confidentiality. Ally suffers more trauma than the other three. Note: First Appearance of Ally Hunter, Robyn Miller, Jamie Collier and Aoife O'Reilly
841	18	"Smoke and Mirrors"	Richard Signy	Steve Bailie	12 January 2013	5.86
Still seriously ill from the stab wounds inflicted during the Holby riots, Yvonne is rushed to ED with a distraught Jordan. Desperately clinging to hope, Jordan refuses to acknowledge the true severity of her condition, much to Zoe's concern. Yvonne insists on seeing her mother with whom she has had no contact since she left home at 17. An incident involving three students results in two of them being taken to ED. Student nurses Robyn and Jamie pluck up the courage to break it to Aoife that her boyfriend is not as honest as she believes. The previous day's coach crash and events at ED today lead to Ally deciding that she must give up nursing. Note: Return of Nick Jordan (Michael French) & Yvonne Rippon (Rachel Shelley) and Final Appearance of Ally Hunter (Rebecca Newman)
842	19	"No Other Medicine"	Richard Signy	Kelly Jones	19 January 2013	6.07
With Yvonne's condition deteriorating, Jordan is determined not to give up hope and fights to keep her alive against the advice and wishes of both Zoe and the ITU consultant, Dr Earl. He assures Diana that her daughter will be saved. Lauren refuses treatment although her condition is now life-threatening. Jeff and Dixie find a boy, Wayne, being set upon by local bullies. At ED Wayne's symptoms and behaviour confuse Sam and Fletch but when Aoife finds him stealing supplies and she is convinced he is a thief, Sam reprimands her. Then he runs away only to be reunited with Dixie and Jeff when he allows them in to attend to his sick mother. Jordan reminds Zoe that he is still the Clinical Lead. A role he assumes when he takes over control of dealing with Lauren who wishes to end her life. His involvement leads to his understanding of what he has been doing and he switches off Yvonne's life support machine. As the team leave at the end of their shift, Sam warns Aoife that Fletch is not only her boss but also is married. Diana and Nick comfort each other beside Yvonne's body. Note: Final Appearance of Yvonne Rippon (Rachel Shelley)
843	20	"Broken Heart Syndrome"	Reza Moradi	David Bowker	26 January 2013	6.00
At the young offenders' institute Neil "Nylon" Johns asks Liam Bendall to contact Jordan at Yvonne's funeral. Jordan refuses to visit Johns and, against the advice of Zoe and Charlie, returns to ED to work. Yasmin Aslam, the pregnant wife of Yvonne's true assailant Mehmet Aslam, after secretly attending the funeral, continues to watch the CCTV video tape of the murder. Bendall's visit to their shop results in the Aslams being taken to ED. An hyperthermic man found near-naked on a road causes Sam to become detective. She finds a youth at the bottom of a cliff. Her relationship with Tom is growing cold. Yasmin gives birth and Mehmet is told that he is suffering from a "broken heart syndrome" and not a heart attack. Jordan relents and visits Johns. His trial is set for the following day, but he is ineffective when he begs Jordan to believe that he did not stab Yvonne. Furious, Jordan berates him and returns to his car. Alarms sound in the building; Johns has tried to hang himself.
844	21	"Life Goes On"	Reza Moradi	Tony McHale	2 February 2013	5.90
This episode continues from where the previous one ended at the young offenders' institute with Jordan sitting in his car. He is prevented from leaving and returns to save Johns' life. The paramedics and Jamie arrive and Jordan returns with Johns in the ambulance. Now unified following the birth of their son, the Aslams are thwarted in their attempt to destroy the video tape by Aoife. Jamie impresses Tom and Sam when he cares for Danny who believes he is transitioning. The person responsible for the Holby riots, Faith Portman, who is Johns' mother is castigated by Jordan. He eventually convinces her to tell the truth about events leading to Wesley Royce's death in front of Johns. He tells Johns that he is convinced of his innocence and leaves to get answers from Mehmet. When Zoe is shown the evidence on the tape, she calls for the police. Mehmet is about to leave home when Jordan confronts him. He confesses, then collapses. Jordan starts to walk away but has no choice other than try to save his life. At ED he performs a life-saving operation. After their shift, Jamie comes out to Jeff and realises his uncle is nothing like his father. Uncommonly, Nick Jordan joins the team in the pub only to hand his keys to Zoe and announce that he is leaving them forthwith. He told them that he might work in Michigan with Anton Meyer. Note: Final Appearance of Nick Jordan (Michael French)
845	22	"If Not for You"	Simon Meyers	Andrew Rattenbury	9 February 2013	6.49
Returning to Holby's ED for the first time since 1998, ex-nurse Martin "Ash" Ashford is now a locum consultant. He finds himself forced to hit the ground running after being tasked to treat a patient with suspected rabies. Charlie is delighted to welcome back his old deputy but Zoe is far from being impressed. Meanwhile, Aoife is forced to take control of her private life when ex-boyfriend Craig turns up. Note: Return of Martin Ashford (Patrick Robinson)
846	23	"Ostrich Syndrome"	Simon Meyers	Anita Pandolfo	16 February 2013	6.23
The medics are overwhelmed by the continuing flu outbreak, and with Zoe off sick, Ash and the team are pushed to the brink as they struggle to deal with the crisis. A man's attempt to track down his estranged wife leads to a car crash, but once in the ED he reveals how she might be able to save their son, the boy she abandoned as a baby 10 years ago and who is now fighting leukaemia. Fletch tries to convince Tess he didn't encourage the attention of trainee nurse Aoife.
847	24	"Though Lovers Be Lost"	Paul Murphy	Kelly Jones	23 February 2013	5.75
Zoe returns from sick leave and ends up in a confrontation with Ash over his decision to keep the overstretched ED open during the flu crisis. She seems to see him as too reckless to offer a permanent position but, after speaking to Charlie, offers Ash the job. Meanwhile, Jeff must persuade a man to act in his ill son's best interests, and Fletch is determined to help an elderly gentleman in love.
848	25	"Brave New World"	Paul Murphy	Julian Perkins	2 March 2013	5.70
Big Mac thinks that he's found the woman of his dreams when he takes part in a charity half-marathon. But when she mistakes him for a doctor, he fails to correct her, leading to her walking away. Ash and Zoe clash after Ash is about to start a risky procedure to save someone's eyesight after an explosion without telling her.
849	26	"Cross Roads"	Robert Del Maestro	Tom Higgins	9 March 2013	5.73
A man sustains a serious brain injury in a road accident, but his son refuses to accept the severity of his condition and berates his dad's girlfriend for giving up on him. Linda helps a pregnant woman cope with her no-good boyfriend, while the student nurses are halfway through their placements, but are told there will only be two posts they can apply for at the end.
850	27	"With and Without You"	Robert Del Maestro	Chris Ould	16 March 2013	5.65
Jeff gets caught up in a marital dispute, Robyn breaches patient confidentiality and Linda tries to give a woman with a learning-disabled son some respite.
851	28	"And the Walls Come Tumbling Down"	Joss Agnew	Emma Goodwin	23 March 2013	5.91
A day at the fair turns out to be anything but fun when Robyn skives off work to enjoy the rides with old school friend Fran, who seems to spend most of her time putting the student nurse down. But after an accident on the ghost train involving a spaced-out drug addict in an Easter bunny suit, she has more to worry about than playing truant from work. Meanwhile, one of the ride owners collapses and is rushed into the ED, where Ash diagnoses a tumour, while Tom finds himself in hot water with both Sam and Zoe.
852	29	"Punch Drunk Love"	Joss Agnew	Steph Lloyd Jones	30 March 2013	5.38
A young man is found in the street, having suffered a fall and been attacked – but he soon makes it clear he doesn't want any medical help. Jamie treats a junior boxer who reminds him of his difficult past, and a woman brings in her husband after what she believes is an MS-related fall down the stairs. Meanwhile, Tom becomes jealous when another doctor asks Sam out, while Big Mac and Noel's new living arrangements cause a few domestic disagreements.
853	30	"Hidden"	Reza Moradi	Julie Dixon	6 April 2013	6.09
Two schoolgirls are brought in after being injured during a science exam, but when tensions rise between the pair, Zoe has to act as peacemaker to reconcile them. Tom helps a young boy suffering from stomach pains, and while he is reluctant to be treated, his mother only makes things worse.
854	31	"Unsilenced"	Reza Moradi	Sasha Hails	13 April 2013	5.34
Zoe goes out of her way to help and protect a young girl who she believes is at risk of female genital mutilation, while Fletch deals with a man who has collapsed with chest pains as a result of his unhealthy lifestyle. Jeff is struggling to find concert tickets as a birthday surprise for Dixie, so Mike tells him he can get hold of some other ones, but not everyone approves.
855	32	"Family Matters" (Note: See also "Family Matters" series 7 & "Family Matters" series 20)	Richard Platt	Steve Bailie	20 April 2013	5.90
Jeff is shocked when he discovers that his father and sister have been involved in a car accident. Jamie stands up to his overbearing father and Linda helps a woman with post-natal depression.
856	33	"Human Resources"	Richard Platt	Tim Loane	27 April 2013	5.60
A robbery at an off-licence ends in violence when shop owner Danny is stabbed – and when one of the gang arrives at the hospital nursing an injured hand, it soon turns out the two know more about each other than they're letting on. When a confused and disoriented Godfrey brings his dog Lulu to the ED, it takes teamwork to discover the sad truth behind his condition. Student nurses Robyn, Aoife and Jamie are interviewed for the two permanent staff positions in the ED. Note: Final Appearance of Aoife O'Reilly (Gemma-Leah Devereux)
857	34	"The Morning After"	Declan O'Dwyer	Matthew Hall & Emma Goodwin	4 May 2013	5.89
Ash faces the moment any medic fears when his daughter Ella (Tahirah Sharif) is admitted to the ED after she and her friend are hit by a car on a night out. The vehicle that ran into them was a police car and the driver was drunk, prompting his colleague to say he was in the driving seat. Meanwhile, Tom's judgement is called into question when he discharges a baby, only for the infant to become life-threateningly ill. Jamie and Robyn have their first day as fully qualified nurses.
858	35	"Isolated Incident"	Declan O'Dwyer	Kevin Rundle	11 May 2013	5.62
A teenage girl is brought in after ingesting an unknown toxic substance, and as the medics question her relatives to find some answers, it becomes clear the family have many unresolved issues. However, Tom isn't coping well after the complaint made against him and when the patient becomes severely oxygen-deprived, he suffers a panic attack. Meanwhile, Linda takes sides when she suspects a patient of being harassed by a gang of youths, despite being mocked by Ash for getting emotionally involved, while Fletch and Tess try to sort out their relationship. Note: Final Appearance of Linda Andrews (Christine Tremarco)
859	36	"The Milk of Human Kindness"	Steve Hughes	Kelly Jones	25 May 2013	5.11
Tom takes the lead when a baby is rushed in with breathing difficulties, and having previously failed to diagnose a youngster's meningitis, he is determined to be thorough in his examination. But as he undertakes tests without clearance from Zoe, Sam begins to worry about her colleague's state of mind. Tess tries to get to the bottom of a reckless patient's desire to live for the moment, and Louise is determined to get Ash all to herself.
860	37	"Love Is the Drug"	Lee Haven Jones	Kelly Jones	1 June 2013	5.13
While out for a jog, Tess is forced to intervene in the stabbing of a teenager, and when the victim arrives at the hospital, she continues to console him. When an agitated mother turns up with her wounded son, Tess identifies him as one of the attackers. Meanwhile, Charlie comes to the aid of a couple whose relationship is feeling the strain of the wife's long-term illness.
861	38	"You Always Hurt the One You Love"	Tim Leandro	Andrew Rattenbury	8 June 2013	3.94
Lloyd is determined to uncover the truth about a cannabis factory on his final day as a nurse after a seven-year-old boy is brought to the ED with suspected poisoning. Meanwhile, Tess and Fletch try to counsel a feisty young couple, and a patient's beloved pet mouse is accidentally set free in the hospital. Note: Final Appearance of Lloyd Asike (Michael Obiora)
862	39	"Garage Flowers"	Tim Leandro	Tim Loane	15 June 2013	5.37
Tom faces explaining to Sam about the diazepam and encounters a dilemma about truth and confidentiality regarding the paternity of an unborn baby. Meanwhile, Sam tries to help a man deal with his anger issues and give him a chance to save his marriage in the process. Robyn becomes concerned about an elderly woman with dementia and her husband, especially when it becomes clear their carer is struggling to look after them.
863	40	"What Goes Up"	Matthew Evans	Stephen McAteer	22 June 2013	5.55
Fletch joins Dixie and Jeff as they are called to a diabetic woman in the city's highest tower block. Matters are complicated when the nurse has a run-in with a group of unruly teenagers threatening a man in one of the lower flats and he ends up having to perform an emergency operation. Ella, Ash's daughter, and her friend are caught stealing from a corner shop, so she sprays an aerosol in the owner's eyes. When they all end up in the ED, the girl manages to convince her dad she wasn't to blame, convincing Zoe that Ash is far too soft on his daughter.
864	41	"Letting Go"	Matthew Evans	Tom Higgins	29 June 2013	4.65
A young boy is clipped by a car and rushed to the ED, while a woman is brought in after falling down the stairs of a busy shopping centre. Eventually, the medics realise the patients are mother and son but wonder why she left him wandering the streets by himself. Ella is up to her old tricks again, masterminding an off-licence robbery that ends up with four youngsters in casualty. Ash still refuses to accept his daughter is as troubled as everyone else believes.
865	42	"A History of Violence"	Karl Neilson	Emma Goodwin	6 July 2013	4.99
A man gives chase to a hoodie who has snatched his mobile and laptop bag, and in the ensuing scuffle he picks up a broken bottle and stabs the robber, realising too late she is a young woman. Both of them finish up in ED. A mother brings in her eight-year-old son with a broken arm, having fallen off a climbing frame. Tom becomes suspicious when he sees bruises consistent with grabbing on the boy's shoulder. Louise is angry with Big Mac for taking pity on a homeless man.
866	43	"Secrets and Lies"	Simon Massey	Anita Pandolfo	13 July 2013	5.00
Tom is summoned to prison on a personal matter, but when a fellow visitor delivers bad news to her brother, the man flares up and pulls out a knife – and within seconds, a hostage situation has broken out. At the hospital, Zoe treats a tearaway teenager who has crashed her mother's car while out joyriding. She has lost the feeling in her legs. Her mother seems more concerned with the inconvenience of losing her vehicle.
867	44	"Mistakes Happen"	Simon Massey	Tony McHale	20 July 2013	5.18
The prison riot intensifies, putting both Tom and Jeff in danger. Tess treats two young sisters who are bearing a great burden. She has her own problems to worry about: the fact she has fallen pregnant with Fletch's baby.
