= Ellen Zitek =

Fictional character from the BBC medical drama Casualty

- Casualty character
- Georgina Bouzova as Ellen Zitek
- First appearance: "Out With a Bang"; 18 September 2004
- Last appearance: "Silent Night"; 24 December 2006
- Portrayed by: Georgina Bouzova

In-universe information
- Occupation: Nurse
- Spouse: Abs Denham (2004−2006)
- Relatives: Nina Farr (stepsister)

Ellen Zitek is a fictional character from the BBC medical drama Casualty, played by actress Georgina Bouzova. She first appeared in the series nineteen episode "Out With a Bang", broadcast on 18 September 2004. Bouzova was originally signed to appear in the show for four months. The character proved popular with viewers and her contract was renewed. Ellen is characterised as a charming and intelligent woman who has a manipulative side. She can be nasty and scheming, traits which initially worried Bouzova who presumed the public would dislike her. Ellen is originally from Ukraine and arrives in Holby City to work as a nurse. She was introduced as the stepsister of Nina Farr (Rebekah Gibbs).

The character's most notable storyline is the portrayal of cancer resulting from a molar pregnancy. The story was based on a real-life case and Bouzova researched the condition thoroughly. She also cut her waist-length hair short to accommodate her character's chemotherapy treatment. Other stories include marrying Abs Denham (James Redmond) for a visa and believing she is pregnant by Harry Harper (Simon MacCorkindale). In 2006, Bouzova decided to leave the show to pursue other projects. The actress was not allowed to discuss her exit storyline until after Ellen's departure had aired. Casualty producer Jane Dauncey wanted to surprise viewers. In the episode titled "Silent Night", broadcast 24 December 2006, Ellen is hit by a motor bike and killed. The character was popular and liked by viewers but polarised television critics' opinions. A Western Mail reporter branded Ellen a "man-eating blonde nurse". Jim Shelley from the Daily Mirror viewed the character as "intensely irritating" and "slightly psychotic".

== Casting ==
Actress Georgina Bouzova was looking for casual work when producers offered her the role of Ellen. She said that it was "amazing" and that she "jumped" at the chance to take on the role. The actress was contracted with the show for four months but this was later extended because the character became popular with viewers. Producers only ever envisioned Ellen as a "stand-in character" but she became a successful character on-screen. On her first day filming Bouzova thought a woman with a bloodied face had been injured on set. When she tried to help her, she discovered that the woman was actually playing an injured character on the show.

== Development ==
=== Characterisation and introduction ===
Ellen hails from the Ukraine and is Nina's younger stepsister. Both sisters rarely see eye to eye but they have a lot more in common than they think. Ellen's stubborn and selfish but has a charm which makes her impossible not to like. She's a daddy's girl who uses men to her advantage.

— BBC Online.

Ellen is characterised as "stubborn and selfish" but has natural charm which makes other characters like her. Bouzova told a BBC Online reporter that "she's a bit of a flirt and she likes to flirt with woman too and win everyone over." Ellen is a charming individual, she makes people believe she is a friendly person and a "good laugh" to be around. Ellen trained as a nurse in Ukraine. Bouzova branded her character a "quite an intelligent woman" who grew up with aspirations of becoming a doctor. Her career goals changed when she realised that the training was too difficult and she could be a nurse instead. The actress added that Ellen thinks she can put her time to better use in finding a rich man to marry. Ellen's personality can be intimidating. Bouzova said that "If I ever met a real-life person like Ellen I'd be very scared!" The character was two-faced hiding a more manipulative side. The actress said that her initial reaction from fans was positive and she was worried how that response could change. Bouzova explained that "her true colours begin to emerge" the audience would dislike her. The actress has suggested the character is promiscuous because she had "flings with half the ward". Bouzova originally feared that viewers would spit at her in the street because Ellen is such a "scheming, nasty character". She added the nurse is "conniving" and she could never imagine trying to get away with the things Ellen does.

Ellen is the sister of Nina Farr (Rebekah Gibbs) and arrives to work in the hospital as a nurse. Bouzova told a reporter from the Western Mail that Ellen arrives in the Holby City to stay with her sister after something happened in her home country Ukraine. Ellen grew up in Ukraine with Nina's mother who married her father. She had travelled to the United Kingdom eleven months prior to arriving at Holby. Ellen and Nina have a poor relationship and on her first day Ellen behaves "outrageously flirtatious" and immediately comes between Nina's developing relationship with Abs Denham (James Redmond). The actress added "she's staying with Nina because she's family and when you're in trouble you go to family first – even though they're not the best of friends." Bouzova added that Ellen sees Nina as an enemy. When she arrives on the wards she instantly charms Jim Brodie (Maxwell Caulfield) and becomes friends with Claire Guildford (Leanne Wilson).

=== Sham marriage ===
In one storyline Ellen asks Abs to marry her so she can stay in the UK after her visa runs out. Discussing the development, the actress told Lucy Lawrence from the Daily Mirror that "Ellen is such a bitch – actually I'm a bit scared of what the public reaction to me will be." Ellen manages to convince Abs to marry her by falsely claiming that her father abusing her. Bouzova told a reporter from Inside Soap that her character thought Abs "was a bit of a hunk" when they first met. As Ellen gets to know Abs she realises how gullible he is and decides to scam him. Bouzova explained that "she realised he's a walkover, so she takes him for a ride. The fact that he's her stepsister, Nina Farr's boyfriend is even better." She added that Ellen always wants what Nina has and decides to steal Abs.

She later reveals that she has debts and loan sharks are after her. Abs is faced with the task of helping her gather the money together. Ellen's lies begin to unravel and Abs discovers that she has lied about her father's abuse. He realises that she only wanted a visa and has been scamming him. Ellen tries to convince Abs that she wants to make their marriage genuine because she loves him. Abs believes she is still lying and throws her out of their home. In episodes airing in February 2005, Abs decides he wants to divorce Ellen. He even threatens to report Ellen to immigration despite the fact it could see him handed a prison sentence. A reporter from Inside Soap revealed that Nina uses the opportunity to tell Abs she still loves him, but this does not change his mind. The looming threat of deportation makes Ellen stressed at work. When she treats a patient she makes an error which leads to her being disciplined.

In another storyline Ellen causes trouble on the wards when she spreads rumours. She claims that Nathan Spencer (Ben Price) is going to be sacked. However it is soon revealed the information Ellen discovered was that the city administration have decided there is no need for two ED wards and Holby's risks closure.

=== Cancer ===
The show developed a cancer storyline for Ellen, a rare cancer form that develops after a molar pregnancy, which occurs after an egg is fertilised outside the uterus and the foetus grows into a tumour. The story was based on the real-life experiences of the Casualty producer Jane Hudson's friend Gena. Bouzova met with Gena to discuss her experiences and gain a better understanding of the condition. The actress took Gena's experiences in mind when filming her character's cancer scenes. In addition the actress visited the Bristol Cancer Help Centre for further research. She spoke with cancer counsellors and spiritual healers. Bouzova also wanted to empathise with Ellen and decided to read books about the condition and watch cancer related movies. The actress told Hoyle that the tears Ellen shed on-screen during the story were real.

On-screen the storyline plays out when Ellen thinks she is pregnant with Harry Harper's (Simon MacCorkindale) baby. Harry had ended their relationship when scheming nurse Bruno Jenkins (Mark Bonnar) started a false rumour that he and Ellen were having an affair. Ellen tells Harry that she is pregnant but he refuses to believe her and she slaps him in the face. Ellen manages to convince Harry and he comes to terms with the idea of having a child with her. Ellen experiences bleeding and goes for a scan to check on her pregnancy. Bouzova told Claire Brand from Inside Soap that "the bleeding gives her a bit of a shock [...] Ellen is nervous about the scan but also excited to be seeing her baby." The scan reveals the molar pregnancy. She added that "Ellen looks at the screen herself and notices straight away there is nothing there." Harry arrives to support Ellen, who Bouzova said was "devastated" as they come to terms with it. Bouzova told Jon Wise of The People that she put her "heart and soul into filming these episodes." Ellen was looking forward to motherhood and "felt complete after years of feeling vulnerable". She was ready and feeling optimistic about life as a single parent.

Ellen later discovers that she may have cancer. Ellen visits the oncology ward alone, but her colleagues do not realise she is ill and dismiss her absence as skiving. Nina asks Ellen about her baby and she is forced to tell her stepsister the truth. Nina supports Ellen and accompanies her to collect her scan results. Ellen is then told she has cancer. Abs later discovers the truth. She asks him to keep her illness a secret and he agrees. Later in the story Ellen collapses while shopping and is taken to the ward she works on. Hoyle stated "her colleagues realise what's going on and see her bald head for the first time." The actress believes the story actually had a positive effect on the character. She explained that "Ellen was so excited when she thought she was pregnant. But her cancer ordeal has changed her for the better."

She begins to undergo chemotherapy treatments and eventually begins to lose her hair. Bouzova knew that the storyline would require her to cut her hair short. When the time came the actress had her waist length hair cut in into a short bob. Producers did not require the actress to shave her head and had her wearing a wig for scenes that she was portrayed as going bald. Bouzova added that her father could not face watching the storyline.

=== Departure ===
In October 2006, Bouzova announced that she had decided to leave Casualty' to pursue other acting projects. The actress also wanted her character to leave the show "on a high" rather than let Ellen become a "stale" character and leave quietly. Bouzova had to remain secretive about her exit, but told Hendry that Ellen would go "out with a bang". She described it as "very exciting and very shocking" and that it would make an "impact" on the show itself. Hendry reported that it was unlikely the character would not be killed off, revealing a number of predicaments the character becomes involved with in her final episodes.

Bouzova branded the experience playing Ellen "a really great journey" and said that her character had transformed dramatically over her tenure. She told Steve Hendry from the Sunday Mail that Ellen started out as a "baddie" but through her storylines with Harry and her subsequent cancer, the audience really cared about her and the character had gained a "big fan base". Casualty producer Jane Dauncey said that she wanted the exit to remain a secret to surprise viewers. She added that Ellen's final scenes "will take people's breath away". When the episode aired, Ellen was killed after she was hit by a motor bike.

== Reception ==
A Western Mail reporter branded Ellen a "man-eating blonde nurse". They added "while Ellen initially turns the male doctors' heads, especially unlucky-in-love American medic Jim Brodie, her ruthless, manipulative side shines through all to soon." Hoyle of the Daily Mirror branded the character a "scheming nurse" and "trouble-maker". They stated that Casualty viewers were "dabbing their eyes with sudden sympathy" over the cancer storyline. Their colleague Beth Neil also branded her a "scheming nurse". Lawrence from the publication described her as the "manipulative Ukrainian nurse Ellen". While Damien Fletcher said that the actress "injected an extra dose of glamour into Casualty." The Sunday Mail's Hendry called her a "mercenary Ukrainian nurse". Jon Wise from The People said that Harry "rocked Casualty viewers by romping with stunning nurse Ellen Zitek and getting her pregnant." The Daily Mirror, Birmingham Mail and Daily Record included Ellen's cancer storyline in their "pick of the day" features. A writer from the Wexford People branded Ellen a "scheming minx" full of "selfishness" and chose the episode which she concealed a patient's nationality in their "one to watch" feature.

Television critic Jim Shelley disliked the character. He called her the "intensely irritating, slightly psychotic Ukrainian stepsister Ellen." He did not think that she was a well acted character. He scathed "with Ellen facing deportation (mostly for her [Bouzova's] appalling acting)". He later branded her "the most irritating person on television." He also opined that she was a "strange" character with an "incomprehensible, irritating accent" much like the EastEnders character Vicki Fowler (Scarlett Johnson). The following year Shelley said he was unsure how much more Ellen being on-screen viewers could cope up with. He also named her the "big wuss of the week" in his television column.

The story involving Ellen and Abs was not well received by the Daily Mirror's Polly Hudson. She ranted "Casualty The Abs/Ellen/Nina triangle is ludicrous – and now dull, too." Tom Adair of The Scotsman branded Ellen a "winsome" character and opined that Abs marrying her for a visa "limp" story telling. Adair thought the character was a liar. He stated "maybe the baby is a figment of Ellen's "rich fantasy life". A rich fantasy life is something boring, anaesthetised old Casualty could be doing with."
