= Luke Bailey (actor) =

British actor

- Born: 7 March 1984 (age 42); Essex, United Kingdom
- Occupation: Actor
- Years active: 2002–present
- Height: 5’9 (1.75 m)

Luke Bailey (born 7 March 1984) is an Essex-born British actor, writer, producer, director and musician, known for his performances in television shows like Casualty, Waterloo Road, Ordinary Lies, Noughts & Crosses on BBC One and the Netflix espionage thriller The Lord's Day.

== Career ==
=== Television ===
Bailey started his career in a short film for Channel 4 titled Spin before leading the CBBC television show UGetMe in 2003, as the show's main character Joe, appearing in 49 episodes over three series. UGetMe was also a launchpad for several other's including BBC actor/presenter Reggie Yates, Harry Potter actor Josh Herdman and director Otto Bathurst. Bailey went on to feature in the Emmy-winning production of The Illustrated Mum, based on the book of the same name written by Jacqueline Wilson before joining the principal cast of long running BBC medical drama Casualty. From October 2004 Bailey played Sam Bateman, the son of clinical nurse manager Tess Bateman (Suzanne Packer), having previously had a minor role cut in 2002. Bailey was nominated for a Screen Nation Award for his performances and wracked up 109 episodes before his departure in May 2007. Although Bailey did reprise his role of Sam for one episode in August 2015 to coincide with Tess's departure.

Subsequently, Bailey featured as guest lead in dramas such as Waking the Dead in 2007, playing cocky Queens Guardsman, Paul Overton, and young killer Caleb Kent in popular ITV murder mystery Blue Murder 2008. To cleanse the heavy palette a little, Bailey joined the regular cast of Ben Wheatley's sketch comedy series The Wrong Door.

Soon after, Bailey joined series 4 of Waterloo Road, where he played enigmatic pupil Marley Kelly.

Following his popular stint at Waterloo Road, in May 2009, Bailey appeared in "Butterfly Effect", a stand-alone story in the BBC One daytime drama Moving On, with Jimmy McGovern as the executive producer. Playing Zach alongside Casualty alumni Susan Cookson and Joanne Froggatt. Around this time Bailey also cameoed in the Manchester set sketch comedy series SkallyWagger.

=== Writing and directing ===
Despite appearances in short films and projects for friends, Bailey began to focus on writing and directing, returning to university to study creative writing. He wrote, produced and directed the play Naked which performed a limited run at The Edge Theatre. Then in 2013, Bailey wrote and directed the play Dissociation at The Lowry Theatre in Manchester. The play received some positive reviews. as well as Faraday's Tunnel and Love Inn. After a period with BBC Writers Room Bailey wrote and starred in InSecurity, an iPlayer short series before continuing acting once more. It was at this point he appeared in Casualty once more and played Jasper in the short lived BBC Waterloo Road replacement series Cuffs.

=== Theatre ===
Bailey toured the UK in the award-winning musical 20th Century Boy, inspired by the life of Marc Bolan. Bailey played the real life character Rolan, Marc Bolan's son. Following his leading role as Ash Driscol in series 2 of Ordinary Lies. Bailey returned to the Northwest to tread the boards in Jumpers For Goal Posts at the Oldham Coliseum. It was not until 2026 that Bailey would return to the stage with the sell out hit Hop - the hopeful hare at the Swansea Grand Theatre.

=== Radio ===
In 2018 Bailey was asked to join the BBC Radio Rep where he spent 6 months recording parts for plays including Wuthering Heights, Tommies and The Archers. During the COVID-19 pandemic, Bailey joined the cast of the bizarrely popular outdated phenomenon Death in Paradise for its two-part Christmas special, where he played, you guessed, murderer Delford Adams. On his days off in Guadalupe, Bailey wrote the screenplay for The Krays: Code of Silence. It was primarily for his late grandfather "Alf Bailey" although the film went on to become number 3 on the UK Streaming Charts.

=== Music ===
Bailey is also a songwriter and has performed in several bands throughout his life, including playing bass guitar in Liverpool-based rock band Televaters, and vocals for Manchester-based blues-rock band Velvet Slow Dogs. In October 2021, Bailey's band Small Black Arrows released their debut EP, The Wave, on 42's Records to positive reviews. and a reworked version of "Trojan Horse" from their acclaimed album The British Museum features in "Code of Silence".

=== Producer ===
Bailey went on to produce a site specific theatre festival in his home town, in which he commission 5x15 minute plays, set in non-theatrical spaces throughout the town, like JT's Fish and Chip Bar, Castle Garage Motors and The Castle Hotel. Following the theatre festival's sell out success, producer's Bailey and Peel set up A New Road Productions and in 2025 produced their debut feature film, The Lost Farm, directed by Ben Mole and starring Tahj Miles, Suzanne Packer, Ella Peel and James Baxter.

=== Reality television ===
In January 2007, Bailey appeared in BBC One's pro-celebrity singing competition Just the Two of Us, in which he was paired with Atomic Kitten's Natasha Hamilton. Later on that year, in October, he swapped singing for circus performing when he appeared on Sky One's Cirque de Celebrité. He appeared on Total Wipeout broadcast on Boxing Day 2009 and was proclaimed the winner.

== Notable roles ==
Year	Title	Role	Notes
2003	The Illustrated Mum	Mark	
2003–2004	UGetMe	Joe	
2004–2007, 2015	Casualty	Sam Bateman	
2007	Blue Murder	Caleb Kent	
2009	Waterloo Road	Marley Kelly	
2009	Moving On	Zach	Episode: "Butterfly Effect"
2016	Ordinary Lies	Ash Driscoll	
2020	Noughts + Crosses	Yaro Hadley	
2021	Death in Paradise	Delford Adams	Series 10, episodes 5–6
