= Wexford People =

Irish newspaper

- Type: Weekly newspaper
- Format: Tabloid
- Owner(s): Mediahuis Ireland, a subsidiary of Mediahuis
- Language: English
- Headquarters: Channing House, Upper Row Street, Wexford, Ireland
- Website: www.wexfordpeople.ie

The Wexford People is a local or regional newspaper published weekly every Tuesday in County Wexford, Ireland. The newspaper contains stories relating primarily to the town of Wexford and its surrounding area, as well as stories relating to County Wexford.
