= Georgina Bouzova =

English actress

Georgina Bouzová (born 1 June 1976) is a British television actress from Surrey, England, best known for her former role as Ellen Zitek in the BBC One medical drama Casualty. Previously, Bouzová had a number of minor television roles including in Doctors, Mile High, The Bill and Murder in Suburbia.

== Early life and education ==
Bouzová was born in Surrey, although she grew up in Manchester with her Czech father Ivan Bouza, mother Rita, and younger sister Jessica. Her surname is pronounced boh-zaw-va:. She was educated at the Manchester High School for Girls.

She qualified as a barrister, having gained her LLB in English Law and French Law from King's College London, with time studying at Sorbonne University in Paris.

== Acting career ==
Bouzová later discovered that acting was her main passion. She joined Casualty in 2004 as Ukrainian staff nurse Ellen Zitek. Her character was diagnosed with, and underwent treatment for, cancer, but died after being run over by a motorcyclist in an accident while chasing an errant patient. Ellen was pronounced dead by her colleagues in the Emergency Department in the second part of the Christmas 2006 episodes (Series 21, Episode 16).

Since leaving Casualty, Bouzová has been concentrating on theatre, playing the leading lady, Vera, in Bill Kenwright's And Then There Were None and the leading part of Mollie in the West End Theatre production of The Mousetrap at St Martin's Theatre in London until January 2010.

== Outside acting ==
Bouzová has also competed in series four of the BBC One TV series Strictly Come Dancing with professional dance partner James Jordan, as a last-minute replacement for Gabby Logan, who was declined permission by her employer, ITV, to take part in the rival network's programme. Bouzová and her partner were voted off on the fourth show of the series.

Bouzová is a writer, and is in the process of completing her first novel. She has also contributed to various publications as a freelance journalist, in The Times and The Guardian newspapers.

== Selected filmography ==
- Cantiquue de la Racaille (1998)
- Nailing Vienna (2000)
- Second Nature (2001)

=== Notable television series ===
- Surviving Cannes (1999)
- Doctors (2000)
- Crossroads (2001)
- Search (2001)
- Night & Day (2002)
- Mile High (2002)
- Is Harry on the Boat? (2003)
- Murder in Suburbia (2003)
- Casualty (2004–2006)
- Strictly Come Dancing (2006)
