= Rebekah Gibbs =

English actress

- Born: 17 March 1973; Torquay, Devon, UK
- Died: 11 November 2014 (aged 41); Pembury, Kent, UK
- Occupation: Actress
- Known for: Casualty
- Spouse: Ashley Pitman (2009–2014, her death)
- Children: 1

Rebekah Gibbs (17 March 1973 – 11 November 2014) was an English television and musical theatre actress.

Born in Torquay, Devon, Gibbs attended Cockington Primary School, Torquay Academy and the Doreen Bird College of Performing Arts in Sidcup. She appeared in West End musical productions including Starlight Express, Grease, and Fame before getting the part of Nina Farr, a paramedic, in the BBC medical drama Casualty in 2004. She played the role for more than 100 episodes (2004–6). Earlier television roles include an appearance in The Bill.

She left Casualty in 2006 to start a family, but was diagnosed with breast cancer in 2008. She wrote candidly about her experiences of cancer for the Daily Mirror. She was hospitalised after a seizure while on holiday in Devon in 2013, due to complications from the cancer. Gibbs died at a hospice in Pembury, Kent, on 11 November 2014 aged 41.

She was married to Ashley Pitman; they had a daughter.
