= Casualty series 19 =

Nineteenth series of Casualty

Casualty
- Series 19
- Starring: Luke Bailey; Ian Bleasdale; Georgina Bouzova; Louise Brealey; Liz Carling; Maxwell Caulfield; Susan Cookson; Elyes Gabel; Rebekah Gibbs; Kwame Kwei-Armah; Martina Laird; Simon MacCorkindale; Sarah Manners; Janine Mellor; Suzanne Packer; James Redmond; Derek Thompson; Will Thorp; Matthew Wait; Leanne Wilson
- No. of episodes: 48

Release
- Original network: BBC One
- Original release: 11 September 2004 – 20 August 2005

Series chronology
- ← Previous; Series 18 Next → Series 20

The nineteenth series of the British medical drama television series Casualty commenced airing in the United Kingdom on BBC One on 11 September 2004 and finished on 20 August 2005.

== Production ==
Foz Allan continues as series producer up until Episode 10 after which Jane Dauncey takes over.

This series saw another increase in episodes, this time to 48. For the Christmas episodes of the series, two cross-over episodes with Holby City were shown, titled as Casualty@Holby City. The series two part opener "The Ties That Bind Us", aired on consecutive Saturday and Sunday nights.

The British pop rock band McFly made a guest appearance as themselves in Episode 19 of the series, titled "Fathers, Mothers, Daughters, Brothers." In the episode, they visit a fan who was injured while attempting to see the band through a hotel window. Producers approached McFly as they wanted a real band to enhance the storyline written. The band accepted and filmed scenes whilst on tour in Bristol.

== Cast ==
=== Overview ===
The nineteenth series of Casualty features a cast of characters working in the emergency department of Holby City Hospital and Holby Ambulance Service. Thirteen cast members from the previous series reprise their roles in this series.

Simon MacCorkindale stars as emergency medicine consultant and clinical director Harry Harper and Maxwell Caulfield as consultant paediatrician Jim Brodie.

Suzanne Packer continues her role as emergency nurse practitioner Tess Bateman, Louise Brealey and Leanne Wilson as staff nurses Roxanne "Roxy" Bird and Claire Guildford and James Redmond as mental health nurse John "Abs" Denham.

Ian Bleasdale stars as operational duty manager for Holby Ambulance Service Josh Griffiths. Kwame Kwei-Armah, Martina Laird and Matthew Wait continue their role as paramedics Finlay "Fin" Newton, Comfort Jones and Luke Warren with Rebekah Gibbs as ambulance technician Nina Farr.

Sarah Manners continues as receptionist Bex Reynolds with Derek Thompson returning as senior charge nurse and emergency nurse practitioner Charlie Fairhead midway through the series after a six month hiatus.

Liz Carling joins the series in Episode 1 reprising her role as Selena Donovan, now a police surgeon. Georgina Bouzova makes her debut in Episode 3 as staff nurse Ellen Zitek whilst Brealey departs in this episode. Luke Bailey arrives in Episode 5 as receptionist and Tess's son Sam Bateman with Kwei-Armah leaving the series in the same episode. Initially Kwei-Armah had signed a contract for another full series but changed his mind to spend more time with his family. On leaving the series he stated "I asked not to die on screen and they respected that."

Elyes Gabel joins in Episode 8 as senior house officer Guppy Sandhu with Will Thorp arriving in Episode 14 as paramedic Woody Joyner.

Caulfield departs the series in Episode 17 which doubles as Casualty@Holby City part one before appearing in part two which was shown on 28 December 2004. This doubles as Episode 11 of Holby City series 7 where his character dies in the hospital explosion. Susan Cookson arrives in Episode 22 as specialist registrar in emergency medicine Maggie Coldwell. Cookson had previously guest starred as anaesthetist Julie Day in a number of episodes in series 13 and 14. Manners departs in Episode 44 with Janine Mellor making her debut in Episode 45 as staff nurse Kelsey Phillips. Wilson leaves at the conclusion of the series.

=== Main characters ===
- Luke Bailey as Sam Bateman (from episode 5)
- Ian Bleasdale as Josh Griffiths
- Georgina Bouzova as Ellen Zitek (from episode 3)
- Louise Brealey as Roxy Bird (until episode 3)
- Liz Carling as Selena Donovan (from episode 1)
- Maxwell Caulfield as Jim Brodie (until episode 17)
- Susan Cookson as Maggie Coldwell (from episode 22)
- Elyes Gabel as Guppy Sandhu (from episode 8)
- Rebekah Gibbs as Nina Farr
- Kwame Kwei-Armah as Fin Newton (until episode 5)
- Martina Laird as Comfort Jones
- Simon MacCorkindale as Harry Harper
- Sarah Manners as Bex Reynolds (until episode 44)
- Janine Mellor as Kelsey Phillips (from episode 45)
- Suzanne Packer as Tess Bateman
- James Redmond as John "Abs" Denham
- Derek Thompson as Charlie Fairhead (episodes 18−48)
- Will Thorp as Woody Joyner (from episode 14)
- Matthew Wait as Luke Warren
- Leanne Wilson as Claire Guildford (until episode 48)

=== Recurring characters ===
- Sasha Behar as Liz Marcart (episodes 34−37)
- Tom Butcher as Tim Gaskill (episodes 34−37)
- Thomas Hudson as Jamie Coldwell (episodes 41−45)
- Irna Iniss as Ruth Abbott (episodes 10−16)
- Adam James as Pete Guildford (episodes 19−43)
- Gary Mavers as Will Manning (episodes 1-6 and 30, from Episode 40)
- Rosemary McHale as Irene Powell (episodes 38−39)
- Cassie Raine as Kate Millar (episodes 3−12)
- Madhav Sharma as Jas Sandhu (episodes 22−24, from Episode 41)
- Peter Silverleaf as Colin Evans (until Episode 44)
- Jack Smethurst as Stan Powell (episodes 38−46)
- Christopher Timothy as Karl Ackerman (episodes 3−13)
- Peter Watts as Iain Garrick (episodes 29−34)

=== Guest characters ===
- Ian Aspinall as Mubbs Hussein (episodes 11 and 17)
- Lucy Benjamin as Gina Taylor (episodes 1−2)
- Luisa Bradshaw-White as Lisa Fox (special)
- Sharon D. Clarke as Lola Griffin (special)
- Laura Donnelly as Fleur Butler (from Episode 48)
- Louis Emerick as Mike Bateman (episodes 25−28)
- Peter Forbes as DI Bentham (episodes 10−11)
- Natalie Glover as Emma Newton (episodes 3 and 6)
- Sarah Greene as Elsa Morrison (Episode 12)
- Andrew Greenough as Dave Adams (episodes 7−9)
- Julia Hills as Caroline Joyner (Episode 14, episodes 26−29)
- McFly as themselves (Episode 19)
- David Michaels as Jeremy Saddler (episodes 27−28)
- Tim Plester as Derek Moberley (Episode 1)
- Melissa Pryer as Eliza Davies (Episode 6)
- Jane Riley as Joanne Coldwell (episodes 43 and 46)
- Prunella Scales as Jocelyn Anderson (Episode 3)
- Christopher Whittingham as Dr James Clifton (episodes 26 and 29)

Episode 17 was the first half of a two-part crossover with Holby City and also featured the following Holby City castmembers:

- Amanda Mealing as Connie Beauchamp
- Kim Vithana as Rosie Sattar
- Hugh Quarshie as Ric Griffin
- Jaye Jacobs as Donna Jackson
- Dominic Jephcott as Alistair Taylor

== Episodes ==
No. overall	No. in series	Title	Directed by	Written by	Original release date	UK viewers (millions)
447	1	"The Ties That Bind Us – Part One" (Note: See also "The Ties That Bind" series 7, "The Ties That Bind" series 13, "The Ties That Bind" series 17 & "The Ties That Bind" series 26)	Jeremy Webb	Catherine Tregenna	11 September 2004	8.53
Two children, Adam and Kayleigh, have gone missing while parents Mick and Gina were visiting Gina's grandfather Reg at the hospital. Mick and his friend Lee see the police talking to Barry, a neighbour who served time in jail for download child pornography; Mick beats Barry after they have gone and is arrested. Claire is being driven to work by Derek, now a taxi driver, but he is distracted by a break-up text from his girlfriend and hits a cyclist, Aaron. After some false starts, Jim tells Claire how to treat him over the taxi radio until an ambulance arrives. Abs realises Melanie, a woman who comes in claiming she fell over drunk, was actually raped. Harry discovers Selena is now working as a police surgeon and married to DI Will Manning, who is leading the investigation. Colin and Lee join a search of the wasteland and find Kayleigh's hood. Lee slept with Gina while Mick was serving in the Iraq War and is trying to get her to leave him. Luke and Nina find Adam in a storm drain but he is swept away before they can get him out. Guest starring Lucy Benjamin, Chris Walker and Andy Robb This episode sees the return of Selena Manning.
448	2	"The Ties That Bind Us – Part Two"	Marc Jobst	Ginnie Hole	12 September 2004	8.24
Nina climbs into the drain and finds Adam trapped. She and Luke manage to get him out when helps arrives but Nina falls and sustains a neck injury, although she is later given the all clear. Harry and Claire have to fit Reg with a pacemaker while Jim has to operate on Barry over a ruptured spleen. Abs and Selena treat Mel and Abs notices Adam and Mel have the same marks but Will manages to alienate Mel until Tess tells her about Kayleigh being missing; she realises she was raped in the same area the children disappeared. The search focuses on the drains and Josh finds Kayleigh's body. Evidence points to Lee and Abs arranges for Mel to identify him as her attacker. Adam and Kayleigh witnessed him strangling her; thinking she was dead, he dumped them down the drain, also hoping Gina would leave Mick for him without them. He ultimately gives a full confession. The staff lay flowers where Kayleigh died but Roxy is guilty that she neglected Nicole throughout the day to support Gina's family and decides she needs to leave. Guest starring Lucy Benjamin, Chris Walker and Andy Robb
449	3	"Out With a Bang"	Robert Del Maestro	Emma Frost	18 September 2004	7.56
Fin and Comfort are called to a fire at an activity centre and learn Emma is among the children trapped inside. A man, Karl, asks Fin to help his wife Sally, who is ill, after their car breaks down but Fin brushes him off and Comfort can only call an ambulance. Karl eventually gets a passerby to take them to the hospital but Sally dies from a pulmonary embolism. Fin and the manager lead Emma, her friends and their teacher to safety, then go looking for two missing boys, who started the fire by smoking. The manager takes one to safety but Fin and the other are trapped, taking refuge in the basement until they attract Josh and Comfort's attention and are rescued. Fin is hailed as a hero but Karl blames him for his wife's death. The other boy's father tries to blame the teacher but Roxy, on her last day, puts him straight. Luke is disturbed to find Kate Miller, who still blames him for her husband's death, is an apparent victim of domestic violence but she refuses to be treated by him. An elderly, recently widowed woman turns up looking for someone with food poisoning: A boy has been breaking into her house, drinking milk and stealing things including her marriage certificate, so she put weedkiller in the milk and refuses to give details unless he returns the certificate. She secretly gives Roxy the details and the boy's mother returns the certificate. The staff give Roxy a send-off and she tells them she wants to work with children. Bex sneaks off during shift, claiming to have a dental appointment, for a liaison with her boyfriend. Nina is upset when a homeless boy she brought in dies. Abs takes her home but she is annoyed when her step-sister Ellen turns up and announces she is a new nurse at the hospital. Guest starring Prunella Scales, Ian Gelder and Angie Garnett This episode sees the arrival of Ellen Zitek. It also sees the departure of Roxanne Bird.
450	4	"Love Labours... Lost"	Christopher King	Peter Mills	25 September 2004	8.52
Selena starts work at the ED, having taken a staff position. One of her first cases is Brian, who suffered a heart attack. Chantelle, the girl who phoned the ambulance, says he owes her money for washing his car. Luke and Nina collect Amy, a diabetic girl who had a hypo, from a homeless shelter and she turns out to be Chantelle's sister. It transpires Chantelle is a drug dealer and Brian is one of her clients, with Amy deliberately taking a hypo because of her actions. Selena has Chantelle arrested but, on learning from Amy that they had to leave home because their father and his friends were abusing them, promises to help them out. A man has run over a couple before crashing; it transpires the woman is his wife and he thought they were having an affair, when in fact he is a travel agent she was booking a surprise holiday with. The driver is arrested. Josh arranges a press conference about Fin's heroism but Karl interrupts to accuse Fin of leaving his wife to die. Nina moves in with Claire but refuses to let Ellen stay with them, so she convinces Abs to let her stay with him. Bex asks Tess for help in reception. Selena goes home unexpectedly and learns Will has been having an affair with Bex, who thought they were separated. She orders Bex to stay quiet about it and moves out to a hotel. Guest starring Robert Cavanah, Lou Gish and Paul Mark Elliott
451	5	"Facing Up" (Note: See also "Facing Up" series 6, "Facing Up" series 12 & "Face Up" series 23)	Ian White	Linda Thompson	2 October 2004	7.81
A young girl is brought in after experiencing an allergic reaction and Abs has to talk her mother, who has struggled with depression, out of abandoning her. An elderly gentleman comes in with bad indigestion and turns out to have swallowed the batteries from his hearing aid thinking they were aspirin. Tess gets her son Sam to apply for the receptionist's job without telling anyone who he is and he is hired. Fin and Comfort get a false call to a housing estate where they have a run-in with some teens. As they drive to the next shout, the brakes fail and they have a minor crash. Fin goes to the scene of a car accident on foot; the two adults in the front seat are injured and their foster son is worried he will be sent away. The woman arranges for him to stay with her mother while they recover. An injured Kate turns up and the staff try to keep Luke away from her, but when he bursts into her cubicle she leaves without being treated. Ellen deliberately ruins Abs and Nina's romantic night in. Comfort tells Tess she is pregnant and is going to tell Fin that night, but despite having left the station hours ago, he doesn't turn up. Guest starring Ryan Conway, Brian Doherty and Richard Beale This episode sees the arrival of Sam Bateman and departure of Finlay Newton.
452	6	"A Life Lost"	Chris Lovett	Julie Dixon	9 October 2004	8.04
Still concerned about Fin, Comfort nearly has a collision with another driver, who promptly runs over a pedestrian. When the woman is taken to hospital, it is found she has medication given to terminally ill patients on her. It transpires her teenage son has a throat tumour and asked her to leave him home alone so he could die; Harry and Selena resuscitate him anyway. Three boys are found hiding in a school boiler room during a holiday. They try to blame the caretaker for a boiler leak but Jim and Claire get them to admit they were indulging in substance abuse; the ones worst affected cuts ties with his friends. A student is brought in with stomach pains. Her friend thinks Selena isn't giving him enough attention so charms Sam into getting Tess and Claire to do further investigation. In fact, the young woman only has constipation, as Selena had already realised. Tess disciplines Sam and it becomes public that she is his mother. Luke goes to see Kate but she sends him away before her boyfriend Dave returns. Selena refuses to talk to Will when he turns up and Harry realises they have separated. Ellen tells Abs that she will have to return home soon and claims her father abuses her. Comfort assumes Fin is with Emma when she can't get hold of Eliza, but then Eliza and Emma turn up at the ambulance station and reveal they haven't seen Fin in days. Guest starring Teresa Gallagher, Jamie King and Jenny Platt
453	7	"When the Devil Drives"	Jim O'Hanlon	Paul Ebbs	16 October 2004	8.81
A man brings in his young son who has had a seizure: The father only has weekend access, having cheated on the boy's mother. Jim learns he was diagnosed with epilepsy but never went to follow-up appointments. It turns out his mother is trying to exorcise him, believing he has a demon as punishment for his father's adultery. She is admitted for psychiatric care but the son still wants to be with her rather than his father. A woman Harry knows from charity work comes in with heart palpitations: She is due in court charged with stealing £100,000 from old people's homes she was running, and an elderly patient with a burned hand turns out to be from one of the homes closed because of the missing money. Jim realises she is faking and sends her off to face the music. An elderly man comes in with a shotgun wound in his bottom but no bulletholes in his clothes: The reason why becomes clear when he flashes reception. Luke drops off some money at Kate's flat; Dave later turns up at the ambulance station and attacks him before being chased off by Josh. Nina is unconvinced by Ellen's abuse story. She tries to arrange a bowling date with Abs but other staff invite themselves along and she catches Ellen kissing Abs. Tess finds Comfort in tears about Fin and invites her to stay with her. Guest starring Stephen McGann, Brigit Forsyth and Geoffrey Beevers
454	8	"Three's a Crowd"	Dominic Lees	David Robertson	23 October 2004	8.72
Abs encounters new SHO Guppy Sandhu and gives him fake horror stories about the staff. As a result, when he and Claire treat a boy who swallowed some unknown tablets, Guppy fails to listen to her when she finds out they were merely HRT tablets; Claire gets Jim to discharge the boy and Guppy makes a fool of himself in Resus, exposing Abs' trick. A pregnant woman is brought in after a fall and her estranged husband is contacted as next of kin; she is now in a relationship with another woman. It transpires that the two women tried to conceive via IVF, after which she secretly slept with her husband to get pregnant. The girlfriend leaves her when she finds out and she tells her husband he can be a father to the baby but she doesn't want to get back together. Nina asks Abs to get Ellen to move out but he relents when he learns Ellen's work visa has expired and she will be sent back to Ukraine if her situation is looked into. Luke visits Kate and finds her with a bruised face; he convinces her and Caitlin to come with him, avoiding Dave. Two boys are involved in a car accident which leaves one potentially paralysed from the waist done; they ran away from home after their mother's boyfriend beat them and were hoping to track down their grandmother. Jim helps them get in touch with her. Josh notices one of them has Fin's penknife and he says he found it by the rail tracks. The police search the area and Selena reports they have found the body of a black male. Guest starring Sara Markland, Janet Kidder and Matthew Crompton This episode sees the arrival of Guppy Sandhu.
455	9	"Little White Lies"	James Strong	Stephen Mcateer	30 October 2004	7.78
Comfort has to identify Fin's body. She later turns up at the ambulance station claiming she's going to work and takes an ambulance without permission. She buys a bottle of vodka but is dragged into a pub by a landlord after a patron starts vomiting blood, although she can do little until Josh and Nina arrive. It transpires the patient is supposed to be off alcohol awaiting a transplant but is worried his girlfriend will leave him; he rallies when she agrees to move in. Two players, Dev and Terry, clash at football practise and Terry ends up hitting Dev in the throat and crushing his windpipe. An attempt to resuscitate him leaves him in intensive care, probably brain dead. Dev's brother Ajay learns his girlfriend Surinder slept with Dev, which is what he and Terry argued about; he forgives Surinder and tells Terry it will be written off as an accident and he should leave them alone. Claire gets the better of a mechanic who tried to bill her for unauthorised work when he turns up with his dust in his eyes. Bex is frustrated to learn Kate is living with Luke. Ellen suggests to Abs that he could help her stay in the country by marrying her. Guest starring Abhin Galeya, Daniel Pape and Sushil Hunjan
456	10	"Dangerous Games" (Note: See also "Dangerous Games" series 6)	Brett Fallis	Paul Marx	6 November 2004	8.00
A new mother, Shelly, is injured when two teenagers, Leo and Danny, throw a firework through her letterbox. Since she will have to stay in hospital, she reluctantly calls Rick, the father of her son James, but he is back with his wife and their son and doesn't want to upset them, so social services are called. Leo accidentally causes the fireworks in Danny's backpack to explode and he dies in Resus; it turns out he was Rick's son. Rick now wants to see James but Shelly blames him for what happened. Guppy tells Abs to suture a patient who was bitten on the leg but he is distracted and gives the wrong injection, causing the patient to suffer a heart attack. Ellen covers for him but he feels guilty that the patient will have to give up his job. Treating a patient who was in a car accident, Guppy ignores Claire's advice and tries to intubate, pushing air into the stomach. He hands in his resignation. Luke gets Kate a job as a cleaner at the hospital. Bex accompanies Sam to one of his DJ gigs but refuses to take him home afterwards. Tess and Comfort see an interview with a woman claiming to be Fin's wife. Comfort visits the woman, Ruth, who says she and Fin married twelve years ago and never divorced, and have a son together. The police tell Comfort a bloodied metal bar has been found: Fin was murdered. Guest starring Alun Raglan, Alex Reid and Jim Findley
457	11	"Horses for Courses"	Ged Maguire	Jason Sutton	13 November 2004	8.69
Guppy and Claire treat a young man injured in a fox hunting accident, when he was thrown from his horse and dragged. His mother arrives to collect him but they are involved in a minor car accident that leaves him paralysed. It turns out that a small fracture was missed on the x-ray and he has now broken his neck. Guppy also manages to pull the foot off a homeless man with gangrene but finally proves himself when he discovers that a patient Selena dismissed as hungover actually has pancreatitis. Harry reveals he never accepted his resignation. Luke and Nina go to treat a man who had an epileptic seizure but are delayed by a vicious dog. The man reveals the dog belongs to his father who is in prison and he is planning to have it put down, although he is told it was the dog's barking that summoned help. Bex accuses Kate of taking advantage of Luke and she and Caitlin move out. Some of the staff attend Fin's funeral, as does Ruth with her son Darren. Comfort collapses at the burial and Tess takes her to Mubbs, who reveals there is bleeding from the placenta. Guest starring Tyron Jackson, Tristan Bayne and Elizabeth McKechnie
458	12	"Past Imperfect"	Shani Grewal	Danny McCahon	20 November 2004	8.25
Harry questions Abs and Ellen about the patient Abs gave the wrong injection to. Ellen continues to cover for Abs but is worried Human Resources know about her visa; Abs eventually agrees to marry her. David, the head of a maintenance crew, finds one of his staff Gilbert is sleeping with a younger woman, Lishanne, who turns out to be David's daughter. David causes Gilbert to be hit in the face with steam and Sam picks a fight with him at the hospital, with Bex reporting him. Gilbert's wife Geraldine turns up and confirms Gilbert was using Lishanne to get at David, who was promoted over him, but Lishanne still insists on moving out. A young woman has had a fall and her grandmother worries it will hurt her dancing career. Selena and Guppy learn she is pregnant; her grandmother wants her to have an abortion, since the same thing ended her career and she seemingly resented the girl's mother for it. The girl needs an operation on her back that could harm the baby and decides on the termination but only because it's not the right time for her. An elderly homeless man comes in and says he is dying; his one-time best friend, who ran off with his wife and raised his child as his own, died recently and was the only thing keeping him alive. Ellen finds nothing wrong with him but later finds him dead. Luke goes to see Kate and says he loves her but she only sees him as a friend and says he's helped her stand on her own for the first time. Comfort has decided to keep the baby after her miscarriage scare but still won't tell anyone. Karl is brought in after slitting his wrists and Selena finds a tooth embedded in his arm. Selena learns Fin was missing a tooth but by then Karl has disappeared. Guest starring Judy Wilson, Sarah Greene and MyAnna Buring
459	13	"Responsibility"	Robert Del Maestro	Danny Mccahon	27 November 2004	8.10
Jim, Tess and Claire deal with a young boy who has a number of infections. Early tests suggest pneumonia but it turns out he has measles since his mother has failed to have him immunised because of bad publicity; he is taken to intensive care with it unclear if he will recover. A man has become impaled on railings he was trying to climb over: He has been meeting his granddaughter in secret after his daughter-in-law banned him from seeing her when his son left her for a younger woman and had a child with her. Harry joins Josh at the scene to help extricate him; Comfort sees Karl nearby but loses him. The daughter-in-law initially repeats the ban but relaxes when her ex-husband turns up and reveals his father has nothing to do with him and his new family. Nina is disgusted to learns Abs is marrying Ellen. Jim tells Josh he is facing charges back in Chicago: He falsified reports when a nurse killed a patient with a potassium injection. Tess tells Sam that Mike has gone to work on the oil rigs and she needs him to keep the job. Guppy asks Jim's help when a father refuses to explain how his daughter's arm was dislocated; it turns out he pulled her back when she was about to run out into the road. Karl is spotted threatening to jump off a building and Josh, Comfort and the police head there. Karl says Fin's death was an accident and jumps to his death. Guest starring Anne Lauren, John Ashton and Caroline Trowbridge
460	14	"Love Bites"	Ian White	Julie Blackie	4 December 2004	7.92
Josh is expecting a replacement for Fin but he never turns up. Luke and Nina are called out to a house where a woman has accidentally locked her boyfriend in the sauna and needs him out before her husband arrives home: It turns out the boyfriend is the new paramedic, Woody Joyner, who also turns out to be the son of Josh's old date Caroline. Selena is called to the police station to examine a prisoner who has had a fall and is due in court. Selena is pressured into signing him as fit to attend but he collapses en route with internal bleeding and it turns out he actually fell from a garage roof. A teenager brings in his underage girlfriend: It turns out they had sex using a tampon as makeshift contraceptive and it became lodged inside her, causing an infection. Tess forces Selena to tell the girl's mother, although she lets the boy stay. An elderly couple come in after the man suffered a fall coming back from holiday; Claire finds scratches on his chest and she and Guppy learn they smuggled a kitten into the country. Quarantine will have to be informed. Guppy and Abs discover a hyperactive boy has had a number of injuries recently after his father took him to a building site; his father tries to take him away but when he nearly causes a car accident he agrees to let him be seen to and social services be informed. Abs confides in Claire about his reasons for marrying Ellen. Jim has gone back to the US to answer the charges without telling Harry the full story. Comfort sees from Fin's bank statements that he was making payments to Ruth and realises she is telling the truth. Ruth says as Fin's legal wife she is making a claim on his flat. Guest starring Adam Thomas, Imogen Poots and Jon Laurimore This episode sees the arrival of Woody.
461	15	"Who Knows Best"	Dominic Lees	Peter Mills	18 December 2004	7.94
A young woman being treated by Jim is identified by the cards on her as Maria, but when Maria's father and brother turn up they reveal it's not her. It's actually a woman Maria met in a homeless shelter and gave her cards to; Maria recently had a kidney transplant but ran off without her anti-rejection medication. Luke and Nina find her at the shelter but she refuses treatment. Her brother drugs her to get her to hospital, where she admits she is scared of not deserving her second chance and agrees to go back on her medication. Jim tells Josh he has been convicted of negligence. Sam tires of the number of patients in reception and starts triaging them himself until Abs steps in. A middle-aged woman turns up with her elderly mother. Selena speaks to the older woman, who has several bruises, and learns she and her husband live with their daughter. Suspecting the daughter is abusing them, she goes to the house and finds the husband tied up. However, it turns out he has Alzheimer's and it was him who injured his wife; their daughter was trying to keep them together. Now, as she feared, social services will play them in residential care and can't guarantee they can keep them together. Comfort is paired with Woody and they pick up two teenage girls complaining of abdominal pains, only for them to run off when they get to the hospital, having used them for a lift. Comfort goes home but finds Ruth has taken over the flat and changed the locks. Guest starring Shenagh Govan, Rita Davies and Peter Polycarpou
462	16	"Forsaking All Others"	Paul Norton Walker	Emma Frost	19 December 2004	7.27
Abs insists on going into work despite it being his wedding day. A care worker is hit by a car whilst saving a boy from being run over and tells Luke and Nina he has Von Willebrand disease, a clotting problem. He later tells Guppy his wife abducted his daughter four years ago during a custody battle. He becomes convinced that a girl brought in by her stepsister after an asthma attack is his daughter. Although some details don't match, Guppy discovers the girl also has Von Willebrand and tells him. He tries to claim her but when the girl's mother turns up he quickly realises she isn't his former wife. Tess chastises Guppy. A photographer is saying farewell to his assistant, who is giving up her job. It is clear they have feelings for each other but he is so desperate to stop her saying so that he causes some scaffolding to collapse on them. At the hospital, Jim counsels him about taking risks and they finally get together. Jim tells Harry he has been barred from practising in the States and Harry advises him to take leave while they sort out the legal situation. Tess goes to Comfort's flat but finds Ruth living there; she tracks Comfort down to a B&B and convinces her to come home with her. Abs and Ellen have a quiet wedding at the registry office with Nina and Claire as witnesses but the staff throw them a lavish reception at a hotel (although Selena tries to ban Bex) and arrange the honeymoon suite for them. Abs refuses Ellen's attempt to consummate the marriage but she warns him he can't be with anyone else or Immigration will get suspicious, while Nina also insists their relationship is over now he's married. Guest starring Jeremy Swift, Amy Ip and Mark Hadfield
463	17	"Casualty@Holby City – Part One"	Michael Offer	Johanne McAndrew	26 December 2004	8.91
The ED staff look after Zoe, a girl who is due to have a heart operation, while Connie and Alistair prep theatre. Josh, Luke and Rosie bring in Shirley, a young woman in labour. Her husband Bob is racing to the scene in his tanker but loses control and crashes into AAU. Since there is structural damage, the building is evacuated with Connie moving her operation to Nightingale wing. Tess sets up a treatment unit in the car park. Kate, a young woman who came in to get a prescription, is trapped under rubble and Harry and Ric have to amputate her arm to free her. Bex is convinced to escort a drug rep, Jason, to the pharmacy but he turns out to be a drug thief and attacks her. Luke escorts Chris, a man he thought just had a virus but who may have contracted a disease in Africa, to isolation. Bob has internal bleeding and just wants to live to see his child. Shirley gives birth but the baby is black, the result of a one-night stand. Donna borrows a baby from another couple to show Bob, letting him die happy, but Shirley rejects the child. Mubbs takes her to get transferred. Harry tells Jim he is suspended but he stays to help Rosie with the baby. It is discovered petrol has leaked into conduits below both wings; Harry tries to evacuate theatre but Zoe's father Frank pulls a scalpel on his estranged wife Sarah and demands Connie complete the operation. Ric takes fire crew to the generator room which is flooded with petrol; maintenance man Neil tries to shut it down but causes a spark which explodes the petrol. Jim, Rosie and the baby are close to the explosion and trapped under rubble. Guest starring Daniella Wilson, Rene Zagger, Nicola Stapleton and Freema Agyeman This episode sees the departure of Jim Brodie
464	18	"Secrets That We Keep"	Chris Lovett	David Robertson	1 January 2005	9.24
The staff are beset with a large influx of those suffering adverse effects to New Year's drinking. Charlie returns in the middle of Harry giving the staff a pep-talk and learns of Jim's death. Josh is having to move out of Jim's place so Charlie invites him to stay with him; Louis is following on and Charlie intends to cut back on work to spend time with him. Guppy realises that the patients are suffering from methanol poisoning and Charlie's scotch is used as a treatment. One of the patients, Brian, is a recovering alcoholic and his wife Beth decides to leave him to concentrate on her own recovery. A father and son are brought in after getting into a fight. The son blames the father's new girlfriend for breaking up his parents' marriage: In fact, his mother had an affair years ago and his father agreed to stay with her until the son finished college. A man, Malcolm, brings in his daughter Mandy who is in labour but quickly leaves; Mandy says her mother left him recently. A doctor is required to administer pain relief at a car crash but Harry sends Abs instead. The patient is Malcolm, who turns out to have taken an overdose: He accidentally killed his wife when she attacked him during a fit of depression. Mandy convinces him to accept treatment even though he will have to deal with the police. Claire learns of Comfort's situation and says her brother, a lawyer, will take on the case for expenses only. Ellen tells Abs and Nina that her visa application still requires her to go home for three months. Guest starring Joanne Redman, Jim Dunk and Flaminia Cinque This episode sees the return of Charlie Fairhead.
465	19	"Fathers, Mothers, Daughters, Brothers"	Robert Del Maestro	Paul Ebbs	8 January 2005	9.03
A mother and daughter climb from a hotel roof to a window cleaner's cradle to try and look into the room where boy band McFly are staying. The daughter badly cuts her leg and the cradle becomes stuck, with Harry having to climb down to help despite being afraid of heights. It transpires that it is the mother who is the big fan, the latest in a long line of obsessions, and the daughter is embarrassed when the band come to see her in hospital. Two other teenage girl fans are admitted with blood poisoning and it turns out they had piercings done which have become infected. A strict Muslim teenage girl, who wears a hijab and refuses to take it off except around female doctors, is brought in after being pushed down the stairs at school. Her more westernised father disagrees with her wearing the clothing, thinking she attracts hostility, but relents when she reveals she was attacked by other Muslim girls ashamed to be themselves. Josh and Comfort are called to the flat where the landlord has fallen on a vase and also hit his head; the tenant has cut hands and reluctantly goes in with them. The landlord's wife believes the pair are having an affair but the tenant says he has been forcing her to sleep with him to make up the rent and she pushed him away when he tried to force her to do it in front of her young son. Abs is willing to accompany Ellen back to Ukraine for her immigration application but she tells him her father is coming to see her. Comfort meets with Claire's brother Pete; he is uncertain they can win in the long run but is willing to try and help her. Comfort discovers Sam defacing her marriage certificate but he denies it to Tess. Guest starring Jenna Boyd, Lesley Hart, Eva Alexander, Thomas Fletcher, Dougie Poynter, Daniel Jones and Harry Judd
466	20	"First Do No Harm"	Ian White	Stephen Mcateer	15 January 2005	9.10
Guppy and Ellen treat a young man who was brought in after drinking heavily. His parents are surprised since he was supposed to be donating a kidney to his brother. Guppy helps him tell his parents he doesn't want to go through with the transplant. Comfort and Woody are called to a motorway incident where logs have come loose from the back of a lorry driven by Clive, which have hit a car driven by a young man, Paul. A couple in a camper van, Ronnie and Michelle, become caught up in the incident and are hit when the rest of the logs come loose. Ronnie sustains a head injury and Comfort and Woody have to drag Michelle to safety. Comfort starts bleeding and is admitted with a placental abruption. It transpires Ronnie was recently sacked by the company Clive works for and Michelle sabotaged the lorry straps in revenge, thinking his old boss Dave would be driving. A recent operation Paul had for a spinal injury has masked a head injury and he dies. Michelle turns herself into the police. Comfort's condition means most of the staff miss Charlie's 50th birthday party to stay with her but she learns the baby has died. Bex convinces Claire to introduce her to Peter and kisses him. Ellen tries to hide the fact her father Gustav is in the country from Abs. Gustav tells Abs and Nina the real reason Ellen can't return to Ukraine: She stole money from his business partner and will be arrested if she goes back there. Guest starring Serge Soric, Shirin Taylor and Andrew Newton-Lee
467	21	"Thrown Out"	Shani Grewal	Peter Mills	22 January 2005	8.71
Abs has spent the night at Luke's. A young deaf girl, apparently unaccompanied, suffers a minor injury from being hit with a car. Her pre-teen older brother removes her from hospital and steals a car but crashes it. He initially claims his father is dead but then he turns up. Abs refuses to let the man see his son, who seems scared of him, and the children's mother is found unconscious in their home by Nina and Woody. The father, who turned to drink after losing his farm to foot-and-mouth disease, was violent towards his wife and walked out on the family, only getting back in touch with them recently, is suspected of hurting her but it eventually transpires the son gave his mother an overdose of her MS medication to frame him, afraid he would hurt them again. Abs realises he misjudged the man. A couple in their 50s come in after the woman complains of stomach pains and nausea; Selena discovers she is pregnant. Her husband is frustrated, since they already have grown-up children, and complains to Comfort, only to be left humbled when he learns of her miscarriage. He suggests they put the baby up for adoption. Tess and Josh arrange for Comfort to spend three weeks with Fin's family in Barbados. Claire is uncomfortable to learn Bex has spent the night with Peter. Guppy and Claire examine an elderly woman complaining of chest pains and realise she is faking it to get the attention of her beau. Selena diagnoses a teenager girl with repetitive strain injury. It is initially believed it is from her violin playing, which she is happy to give up, but Claire realises it is actually from persistent texting, meaning she will have to give up her mobile phone. Sam stays behind after work deleting files. Abs argues with Ellen and kicks her out. Guest starring Craig Roberts, David Roper and Rhoda Lewis
468	22	"The Cost of Honesty"	Paul Norton Walker	Peter Mills	29 January 2005	8.88
A boy is injured in a hit and run outside a supermarket. A woman looks after him until Luke and Woody arrive and explains she is the new registrar, Maggie Coldwell. The boy dies in hospital. The police tell the staff to look out for anyone with cranial trauma although Bex is worried about patient confidentiality. Two youths are brought in claiming to have been in a football accident but Selena and Sam realise they are lying and were in the car. Selena arranges for the boy's father to confront the driver before he is arrested. Having initially been reluctant, the father agrees to his son's corneas being donated for transplant. Luke and Woody go to pick up an elderly man having an angina attack at a language school. They discover a Russian girl with a badly cut arm and insist on taking her in too. Ellen is asked to translate for her; the girl asks her to call the police and Immigration but instead she claims the girl is just worried about the medical bill. The man with her reveals the "language school" is a brothel where East European girls are kept against their will. The police are sent but Abs is disgusted with Ellen. Tess learns he has thrown her out and arranges her a room in the nurses' quarters. Guppy's father Jas tries to get him and Maggie to arrange a bed for a private patient but they both refuse. Bex goes to surprise Pete at his office but finds him kissing another woman. Luke and Woody play a practical joke on Charlie and Harry, sending them both to the conference room then sending Selena up saying two old men need help. Tess finds Sam burning patient files, insisting it's the only way to keep confidentiality. Guest starring Paul Rattray, Anthony Adjekum and Mark Womack This episode sees the arrival of Maggie Coldwell.
469	23	"Truth Will Out"	Terry Iland	Linda Thompson	5 February 2005	9.18
Maggie wants to admit a woman that Guppy diagnosed with indigestion. Jas tries to block it but has to back down when Guppy does further tests and discovers she actually has angina. Luke and Woody are called out to an elderly man who had a panic attack during a burglary. Charlie, Harry and Selena attempt to play a joke on them by claiming they could have caught an infection from the man's parrot and need injections in their posterior, planning to photograph them, but they see through it and leave dummies in their place. Claire is chatted up by a patient with an injured hand and a scratched face who turns out to be the burglar. A girl, Naomi, is exercising at a stables when the stable girl, Kirsty, runs out in front of her. They both end up in hospital; Naomi's father Tim is a lawyer. Kirsty turns out to be faking: She has become sexually obsessed with Naomi, who only saw her as a friend. Her mother Maureen admits it isn't the first time and her cousin sexually abused Kirsty when she was young; Maureen has never reported it or allowed the girl to have counselling. When Tess has to stop Kirsty slashing her wrists and she admits she caused the riding accident to try and kill them both, Maureen admits she needs help. The incident prompts Tess to admit to Abs that Sam has a problem. Naomi needs treatment for a bruised brain and Ellen, who has been distracted all shift, nearly gives her an injection that would have killed her. Harry threatens her with repercussions. Guest starring Vinette Robinson, Helen Sheals and Brian Cant
470	24	"Hoping, Wishing, Longing"	Dominic Lees	Julie Blackie	19 February 2005	8.71
Abs goes round to see Sam and finds him increasingly paranoid and scared of being watch. Tess is convinced to send her other children to stay with their grandparents. A young boy is brought in after experiencing an allergic reaction to the nuts in a chocolate bar his child minder left lying around. His mother initially blames the child minder but later admits she feels guilty for not spending time with her son. A young man suffers an accident at a garage when a car rolls onto him and he breaks both his arms preventing it from crushing him. He admits to his parents that he has gambled away the money they gave him and he was fixing the car, which is stolen, to pay off his debts. Even though he may have nerve damage, his parents reluctantly refuse to help him further. A 15-year-old girl is brought in apparently suffering a miscarriage but scans show she lost the baby some time ago and Selena deduces she has had an abortion. Her stepfather is obviously hiding something: It transpires he arranged the abortion in secret after she got pregnant by a boy at a sleepover, since her mother, who has had several miscarriages since remarrying, was pressuring her to keep the baby and seeing it as a replacement for the child she lost. Joshua, a patient of Jas', is brought in with acute pancreatitis. Jac agrees to admit him but he dies before he can be transferred. Harry and Charlie both want Ellen sacked but Tess is happy to let her off with a verbal warning. Ellen admits she doesn't have a work permit but Tess lets her stay on while she tries to sort it out with HR. Claire takes Bex to a Valentine's ball to cheer her up but they find Peter there with another woman. Bex messes up his date but rejects Peter when he thinks she still wants him. However, he forces his way into her flat and rapes her. Guest starring Kenny Ireland, Dominique Moore and Suzanne Maddock
471	25	"Naming Names"	Christopher King	Catherine Tregenna	26 February 2005	9.23
Nina and Woody are called out to a nightclub where a young man, Stuart, has been badly beaten by Craig, his girlfriend Jo's ex, leaving him with a ruptured spleen. Craig got Jo hooked on drugs and is still supplying her, also trying to get her to sleep with him as payment. After arguing with Stuart and her brother Andy, Jo is thrown out and takes an overdose in a suicide attempt. Andy blames Craig and stabs him with surgical scissors, killing him. He turns himself in to the police. Two cleaners bring in a rich businessman they found collapsed in a cupboard and Colin tries to get the two women to agree to a double date with him and Charlie. The patient admits to his saviours that he is actually a waiter who found the businessman's wallet and made use of his invite to get into an exclusive party only to end up hiding when the real one turned up. The women smuggle him out of the hospital and he shares the contents of the wallet with them. Mike is shocked to return home from the oil rigs and find Sam in a catatonic state. Bex calls the police about her rape but is horrified that Selena is the doctor examining her; the two women finally clear the air. Bex nearly leaves the station but is scared to get into a taxi with a male driver so presses charges and identifies Pete as her attacker. He is arrested and denies it. Guest starring Bill Fellows, Jacqui Boatswain and Alice O'Connell
472	26	"Boys Don't Cry" (Note: See also "Big Boys Don’t Cry" series 5)	Chris Lovett	Jo O'Keefe	5 March 2005	8.08
Bex has called in sick and Caroline is covering reception. Peter is released on bail and tells Claire what is going on, continuing to deny the rape; the news is soon around the hospital and Luke believes Bex. A neurotic man comes in with a dislocated shoulder. After it is reset, his pregnant girlfriend goes into labour. Guppy and Woody attempt to take them to maternity but get stuck in a lift and Claire and Caroline have to direct them to deliver the baby. Comfort returns to work after her holiday. A couple come in with minor cuts claiming they were mugged. Charlie sees the man has bruised knuckles and suspects he is abusing his girlfriend. However, when the girlfriend hits Claire, it becomes clear she is the abusive one and the humiliation has caused the man to become bulimic. Ellen fails to turn up for her shift and Abs is questioned by Immigration; he denies knowing about Ellen's visa status. Harry tells Charlie he has lost money on the stock market and Charlie notes he knows people who have made money by buying houses to let. Tess and Mike take Sam to see Dr Clifton, who decides to admit him when he confesses to being suicidal. Mike decides to go back to the oil rigs but drives the car carrying himself and his friend Nathan into a lorry and is left with severe chest injuries. Guest starring Cora Bissett, Tom Smith and Joe Sims
473	27	"Family Day"	Robert Del Maestro	Danny Mccahon	13 March 2005	7.00
Woody has just been assigned as a motorcycle paramedic. Josh is frustrated when he and Comfort are called out to a woman in labour even though her husband could have driven her to hospital himself. Father and son Darren and Andy mess about on a water ski but crash into a grounded boat, injuring grandmother Peggy and leaving the middle-aged owner Arthur trapped under the boat and his wife Sheila trapped on board. Woody arrives first followed by Luke and Nina; Sheila is having a heart attack and Nina has to climb into the unstable boat to give her medication. Darren clashes with his former wife Millie when Andy goes missing; Woody's attempts to find him are hampered by the fact he can't swim, but when Andy, who has been hiding, runs into the lake and gets into trouble, Woody manages to keep him afloat until they are both rescued. Sheila is recovered but Arthur dies when the boat is removed. A man who either jumped or fell from a motorway bridge is brought into hospital; the staff discover he is soldier and wonder if he was attempting suicide but it turns out he fell while getting dove feathers from a nest to leave with his daughter while he is abroad. Tess learns Sam is bipolar and visits Mike, who remains in a coma. Harry and ITU doctor Jeremy Saddler advise turning off life support, but Mike continues to survive without it. Guest starring David Glover, Diana Bishop and Amelia Lowdell
474	28	"Animals"	Declan O'Dwyer	Gregory Evans	19 March 2005	8.32
Helen, an old acquaintance of Harry's, has taken the position of director at a medical research lab but is being targeted by a militant animal rights activist, Patrick. He and his reluctant girlfriend Lexie leave a bomb on her doorstep which ends up being triggered by her friend John, the local vet. Comfort and Woody manage to retrieve him from the scene but he has lost two fingers and an eye and may be left completely blind. Lexie crashes her car after running over Helen's dog. Harry and Charlie's differing methods of persuasion combine to convince her to talk to the police and Patrick is arrested when she summons him to the hospital. Helen decides to give up the post. Guppy is visited by an old uni friend, Anita, who claims to have stomach pains. She asks him out but he learns she is due to marry an older man in India and just wanted to see what it would be like with him. A young girl, Polly, is brought in from a sleepover and turns out to have appendicitis. She asks the staff to call her grandmother Carolyn, who her mother Jean hasn't spoken to since Carolyn ignored the wishes of Jean's brother at his funeral. However, they began to repair their relationship when they discover Polly called Carolyn to support Jean if she died. Abs and Nina are interviewed by immigration and try to convince them Abs believed his marriage to Ellen was for real. Later, they kiss. Mike has recovered consciousness but has suffered a stroke that has left him paralysed down one side. Tess doesn't feel up to looking after both him and Sam. Bex returns to work but leaves early after an argument with Claire and ends up drinking heavily at home. Charlie and Selena call round and find her collapsed. Guest starring Sameera Reddy, Ingrid Lacey and Lorna Fitzgerald
475	29	"Forbidden Love"	S. J. Clarkson	Jason Sutton	20 March 2005	7.42
Bex is recovering from her hypo. Abs and Nina are trying to keep their renewed relationship secret but Luke quickly finds out. Selena examines a freelance cake decorator with vision problems; Charlie realises she is suffering from snow blindness as a result of sunlight reflecting off the white icing. A person with MS is found on a park bench having taken an overdose. He has a DNR order in place but since it makes no mention of suicide Maggie decides to resuscitate him. His girlfriend asks the staff to stop treatment but his daughter insists they continue, even after seeing his suicide note. Since he will need constant care if he recovers, his girlfriend hands over responsibility to his daughter, saying she's already said her goodbyes. A young man calls Comfort and Woody to his older brother's shop where his girlfriend has had a severe asthma attack; his brother threatened to send him back to India if he didn't stop seeing her. He later is hospitalised himself after falling down some stairs; his girlfriend was caught in possession of cannabis once but has been trying to get him clean after he became addicted to heroin at university. Claire tries to explain the situation to the brother but earns a reprimand from Charlie and the couple end up running away together. Luke comforts Claire and they kiss. Claire and Nina learn their landlord is selling the house. Mike has been moved to a general ward and Tess visits Sam to tell him what is going on. Abs and Nina are having dinner when a loan shark, Iain, turns up and reveals Ellen borrowed £15,000 from him: He expects Abs to repay the debt, starting with £5,000 next week. Guest starring Amanda Boxer, Liz May Brice and Sarah Barrand
476	30	"And On That Farm"	Graeme Harper	Stephen McAteer	26 March 2005	7.09
At a farm, Sophie supervises her boyfriend Davie and father and son labourers Joe and Niall in disposing of some drums in landfill; her father Adam is planning to leave the farm to her brother Michael. An explosion caused by burning methane injures Joe, with Adam and Davie getting minor injuries. After they have gone to hospital, Sophie sends Davie and Niall to dispose of the evidence. Selena is called out by Will and DS Nikki Acott, Will's new girlfriend, when Davie is found lying in a ravine; he is rushed to hospital but dies in Resus. It is discovered Joe and Niall are suffering from arsenic poisoning, having been disposing of arsenogenic acid. Niall tries to get rid of the drums but Selena talks him out of setting fire to the dangerous chemicals. Sophie is arrested when it is revealed she killed Davie on discovering him stealing the profits from the venture. Luke and Claire are seeing each other in secret, despite being on different sides over Bex. Abs learns Iain has a record for GBH. Will tells Selena he wants to get back with her but she instead asks for a divorce. Guest starring Kate Miles, Colin Spaull and Ben Turner
477	31	"Running Out of Kisses"	Brett Fallis	Paul Ebbs	2 April 2005	7.87
A young boy who developed SSPE after a bout of measles and is not expected to survive to Christmas is given an early celebration by his parents. When he starts fitting, his older sister calls an ambulance behind her parents' back. Despite the parents' protests, Josh insists on taking him in and Harry and Guppy insist on treating him. The sister discovers her parents stopped giving him his medication so he would die during the celebration and understands their reasons when he dies anyway. Selena is frustrated that Will is refusing to respond to her divorce petition. An elderly woman collapses at a travel agent's; she has terminal cancer and was planning to use her savings to go on holiday but dies in hospital. Abs contemplates taking £3,000 he found in her bag but his conscience is pricked when a man who was there when she collapsed brings her glasses to the hospital, and he hands the money in. Nina convinces him to move in with her instead: They are waiting to hear from the new landlord. Comfort is concerned when Tess brings Sam home against medical advice but he seems fine. A man, Tom, tells his boyfriend Nick he is HIV positive, causing Nick to crash their car in a fury and leave Tom with spinal injuries. Nick is HIV positive himself, but since they have always used precautions, he is convinced Tom must have cheated. Selena points out nothing is completely safe and he accepts responsibility. Bex returns to work but is thrown into a panic when Claire tells her Peter is outside wanting to speak to her. She becomes convinced he is hanging around outside her house and tells Luke she's going to drop the charges. Guest starring Imogen Stubbs, Keiron Self and Gabrielle Hamilton
478	32	"In the Dark"	Joss Agnew	Catherine Tregenna	9 April 2005	8.48
Ron, an alcoholic depressive at the psychiatric hospital, accidentally starts a fire while smoking and burns his arm. Sam insists on visiting him even though Tess is trying to keep his illness quiet. Ron is upset to learn a friend of his died during the night; he used to be a preacher but a parishioner committed suicide after he left him alone to visit a lady who gave him single malt. Sam assures him he's helped people since. A scrum collapses at a boys' rugby match, injuring two boys, Carl and Vinny. Josh, Nina and Woody arrive to find the referee moved them to the changing room and they have spinal damage; Carl has lost feeling in his legs and Vinny movement in his arm. Vinny's sister Elle bring him his drawing things and Selena and Guppy realise he lied about the arm injury since his father Gary forces him to play. Vinny thinks he broke up the scrum by backing out but Carl says he is to blame; his own father James forced him to play with flu and he collapsed. Carl dies; the flu caused a heart infection which was exacerbated by high blood pressure. Two men turn up drunk after a stag night; one of them, the bride's father, has lost his prosthetic hand and Claire gets him a replacement which Vinny tattoos. Harry tells Claire and Nina he is their new landlord. Abs and Nina discover Garrick has taken the TV and stereo as payment. Claire gets frustrated by Luke constantly leaving her to support Bex and tells Bex they are together, causing her and Luke to fall out. Guest starring Ian Gain, Christopher Villiers and David Sterne
479	33	"Cops and Robbers"	Martin Sharp	Katie Hims	16 April 2005	8.54
A man, Dan, is hit by a car after being chased by a policeman; he is a suspect in an armed robbery. He fails to recognise his girlfriend Shelley on coming round and she admits to him that they only met that morning and she wanted to check he was all right. He convinces her to give him an alibi but a beaten-up woman left waiting in reception, Andrea, turns out to be Dan's wife; he was with her at the time of the robbery but she withdrew the alibi on finding out he had been cheating and they got into a fight. Shelley withdraws her statement. Maggie is due to leave early for an exam in Edinburgh. A woman with terminal cancer comes in with fluid on her lungs; she is getting married that day to a man she met just after her diagnosis and her mother refuses to accept the seriousness of her condition. Harry and Maggie want to admit her but Maggie agrees to drain the fluid on condition she comes back after the wedding. She also convinces her mother to attend. An elderly lady comes in with a nosebleed after stopping her heart medication since it left her too tired to care for her sister. She is persuaded to go back on the medication. Maggie is about to leave when a decorated who came in with a busted ankle collapses in the car park, helping to revive him. Luke and Woody give her a lift to the airport. Abs spends the shift trying to borrow money from people and Nina returns home to find him beaten up. Karen talks Bex through the court proceedings. Sam tells Bex about his bipolar and that he thinks she's brave. Claire meets an agitated Pete, who has been put on leave until after the case, and is concerned when he talks about Bex refusing to let him in. Guest starring Pauline Campbell, Jean Trend and Jacqueline Boatswain
480	34	"Sweet Revenge"	Nic Phillips	Jo O'Keefe	23 April 2005	8.21
A boy is brought in by feeling ill. His mother has become obsessed with cleanliness since their daughter died of cot death, which the father refuses to discuss with her. The mother admits to washing their food with bleach but it turns out the actual cause is drinking pesticide which the father left unattended in the shed. Tess tells Harry she wants the nurses to wear unisex scrubs since the female nurses' short dresses encourage sexual harassment. Garrick tries to put pressure on a client but the client's friends attack and beat him up. He refuses a full examination, only letting Maggie and Guppy stitch him up. Abs finds him in trouble and, after some hesitation, summons help but Garrick dies of internal bleeding, leaving Abs in the clear. An elderly man whose friend just died is brought in after his grandson summons help. He admits he took ecstasy to see what it was like and agrees to stop. Charlie and Luke support Bex on the first day of the trial; Bex and Selena give evidence but Peter's barrister does her best to undermine them. Luke is angry when Claire tells him Peter admitted it to her. Guest starring Paddy Ward, Michael Carter and Jacqui Boatswain
481	35	"Desperate Measures"	Nic Phillips	Rob Hume	30 April 2005	7.68
Abs and Nina stumble across the aftermath of a road accident outside their house: A moped drove out in front of a van, with the van driver having run off leaving an elderly man in the passenger seat. Guppy examines the moped driver, who acts drunk but whose alcohol level is normal. He diagnoses him with Manier's disease. A woman tries to take the elderly man from hospital; she is his daughter and was driving. While she was in prison for smuggling, he was diagnosed with Parkinson's and depression and her sister put him in a home, where he is sedated and restrained. She was trying to get him to friends in Spain. Her sister arrives but is convinced of the situation and lets them go. Charlie and Luke see an overweight teenager collapses outside the court; his mother has been charged with assaulting one of his bullies and keeps giving him unhealthy snacks. Selena challenges her over his health problems and even the boy accuses her of making him fat. She admits she has been overprotective since her husband walked out on her and the boy was born premature and agrees to take him to a dietician and get help. The nurses develop a rash that turns out to have been caused by a new washing powder designed to kill MRSA. Harry reveals he is moving a new tenant into the house, meaning there is no free room for Abs: It turns out to be Guppy. Peter gives evidence in court, insisting Bex consented to sex, and the bar owner backs up his version of events. Peter tells Claire that what he said to her would be dismissed as hearsay but prosecutor Gaskill tells Luke that anything said to a witness would need to be disclosed and he tries to get Claire to tell everyone. Guest starring Josh Brown, Kate Lonergan, Lizzie Roper and Michael Carter
482	36	"A Question of Loyalty"	Chris Lovett	Peter Mills	7 May 2005	8.35
A number of residents of a care home are brought in with a stomach bug. Charlie can't find the notes for one of them and Tess is forced to admit that Sam destroyed them. It turns out most of the residents are faking and two took laxatives to fake diarrhoea. They are protesting about the care home manager and will keep coming in unless Harry has her replaced. A minibus driver comes in with a headache; she is taking a group of judo students and their leader to an important competition. Guppy realises she is simply stressed and gives her an analgesia but she later crashes the bus, mildly injuring one of the girls. Guppy has trouble proving he told her not to drive but it turns out the group leader pressured her into it and had also been whipping the girl with a belt for discipline. Although she insists she has been giving poor children somewhere to go, she will have to be reported. An Asian woman comes in and is diagnosed with tuberculosis. Selena recognises the man with her, Terry, as a police officer: He explains the woman is helping them catch some people smugglers after her brother drowned on a crossing. He accepts those with her will have to be found and tested, even though it will result in the smugglers going to ground. Harry gets Woody to fix a shower at the share house, resulting in them walking in on Abs and Nina. Claire gives evidence but doesn't mention what Pete said, despite Gaskill prompting her. The jury retire to consider their verdict and Luke tells Claire he wants nothing to do with her. Guest starring Victoria McFarlane, Karen Clegg and Michael Carter
483	37	"Fat Chance"	Jim O'Hanlon	Danny McCahon and Robert Scott-Fraser	14 May 2005	7.99
A woman is brought in after collapsing at a slimming club; despite exercising, she has put on three stone. Selena discovers she has a large cyst in her stomach: Once it is removed, her weight will return to normal. A driver hits a motorcyclist and drives off, with the man's foot stuck to his grill: He was driving while banned. His wife takes the foot to the hospital but it cannot be reattached. She agrees to tell the police she was driving so the man can claim on her insurance but tells her husband to leave the house. The motorcyclist is visited by both his wife and his mistress. He manages to keep them apart but the mistress decides to end things, tired of the secrecy, and he is happy with just his wife. Abs is tired of hiding his relationship with Nina. Charlie decides to take no action against Tess and Sam. A woman convince her husband to look for their drug addict son, who is living on the streets. Her husband is later brought into hospital after being stabbed; when her son is brought in as well, she accuses him of being responsible. In fact, the father was mugged and the son injured trying to help him, but he dies before his mother can apologise. The judge accepts a majority verdict of ten and Peter is found not guilty. Afterwards, he tells Claire he's going to make Bex pay. Guest starring Raji James, Emma Rand and Michael Carter
484	38	"Truth and Consequences"	Shani Grewal	Peter Lloyd	4 June 2005	8.23
A teenager, Ajeesh, is pushed out of a window. Guppy is shadowing Woody and Comfort for the day and their first call is Ed, a teenager injured at a skate park, but Woody and Comfort refuse to treat him when he is racist. They then pick up Ajeesh and Guppy successfully diagnoses him with SVT. Ed makes his own way to the hospital and it transpires he attacked Ajeesh; his mother Dawn is living with Ajeesh's father Sunil. Disgusted at his lack of remorse and that he has adopted his father's racist attitudes, Dawn turns him in to the police. Luke tells Bex that Claire knew she was raped and Bex harangues and slaps Claire in front of the rest of the staff. Maggie is visited by parents Stan and Irene and learns Stan has Alzheimer's. Abs hears Immigration want to see him and later tells Nina they're not pursuing the case. A man is chased by people in a car and shot. It transpires he is giving evidence against drug dealers but has refused witness protection for himself and his family, not wanting to be forced to leave their home. The gunman later turns up at the hospital and takes the man's wife hostage but Luke intervenes and overpowers him, leading to the gunman's arrest. Guest starring Chuk Iwuji, Josephine Melville and Colin Wells
485	39	"Baby Love"	Luke Watson	Peter Lloyd	11 June 2005	7.38
Josh is called to a house where a baby has stopped breathing and trips while carrying her. She is pronounced dead at hospital of suspected cot death, although the father insists there was a pulse. An investigation begins but the father admits he had her in bed with him and rolled over on top of her. An electrics worker finds his assistant is sleeping with his underage daughter and causes an accident that sees them both electrocuted. The assistant has heart and kidney damage; his boss pays him compensation on condition he leaves town and stays away from his daughter. A pregnant woman drives into the back of a man's car in a car park. At the hospital, they arrange a date but Guppy learns the man often removes the bulb from his brake lights and then brakes sharply in front of women he finds attractive to arrange a meeting. Guppy tells the woman who quickly leaves the hospital. Two young brothers are brought in after separate accidents on a skateboard, which their grandmother gives to Abs. Stan disappears during an appointment at the hospital and turns up with an injured hand. Irene says she can't take any more and leaves him with Maggie. Claire goes to see Peter's ex-girlfriend Zoe in the hope she will back up his story but instead she admits he raped her as well. Claire tells Peter she wants nothing to do with him and Peter accuses Bex of ruining his life. Guest starring Paul Hawkyard, Graham McTavish and Jamie Lomas
486	40	"Swallowers"	Declan O'Dwyer	Gregory Evans	18 June 2005	6.35
Will leads a police raid on a flat when drug dealers are holed up. They find a courier dead from an overdose and another one fitting; while teenage dealer Russell and associate Matt are both injured trying to escape, leading them to all end up at the hospital. Drug traffickers Tony and Ericka avoid the flat when they see the raid and take two mules, Turkish mother and daughter Melissa and Kamille, to another address. Selena is called in as a police surgeon to certify death. Will's sergeant, Straker, is secretly working with the dealers and helps Russell get rid of evidence. Guppy pricks himself while stitching Russell, who has hepatitis B. Matt reveals he isn't a trafficker but Kamille's boyfriend; he did a deal to smuggle her and Melissa into the country. Kamille discovers Ericka plans to let Melissa die when she starts leaking heroin, so flees and says she won't return the drugs unless Melissa is treated. She is taken to hospital after being found collapsed but leaves when Claire and Maggie get suspicious. Tony and Ericka kidnap Selena; she sees Straker with them but doesn't recognise him. She manages to call Will and tip him off. Tony is arrested and Melissa is taken to hospital but Ericka escapes. Will takes Selena home and arranges a guard. Ericka tells Straker they will have to kill her. Guest starring Peter Amory, Jake Canuso and Richard Elis
487	41	"The Long Goodbye"	Christopher King	Nick West	25 June 2005	7.14
Comfort and Luke are called out to a camp site where two children have carbon monoxide poisoning after sleeping with a gas lamp on in their tent. Their mother initially claims they turned it on during the night but it quickly becomes clear she left it on: Her husband took the children away after she had mental health issues and she only has limited access. The boy is soon recovering but the girl might have brain damage. A down-and-out comes in with most of his fingernails missing but walks out when Claire refuses to give him morphine. Two more tramps turn up with a large amount of money after being in a fight; one of them discharges himself to claim his share of the money but later collapses and dies of a blood clot to the brain. Two students come in claiming to have been mugged; the man is a patient of Jas', who Harry and Guppy reluctantly contact. It transpires that they paid the down-and-out to rip his own fingernails out and the others to fight each other as part of a psychology experiment: They may now be charged as accessories to murder. Claire tells Bex she now believes her about Pete; Bex intends to leave Holby but convinces Luke and Claire to make up. Maggie leaves her teenage son Jamie to look after Stan but comes home to find Stan has started a fire by putting an electric kettle on a hob. The drugs have been removed from Melissa but she has terminal rectal cancer. Kamile arrives and Will lets her see Melissa. Straker tries to take her away; Selena recognises him but is stabbed by Ericka. Kamile causes the car to crash and all three end up in hospital. Selena is found by a passer-by and rushed into surgery. Guest starring Yildiz Hussein, Basiena Blake and Peter Amory
488	42	"A Father's Love"	Craig Lines	Stephen McAteer	9 July 2005	6.78
Selena is recovering in HDU. Will is secretly seeing Ellen, who thinks she can get her job back. Harry tries to tell Selena he loves her but she stops him. Charlie is accompanying Josh and Nina as part of a nurse practitioner's refresher course. They are called to a flat where the mother of two boys has been attacked by a burglar. The police arrive and suspect her estranged husband, who says the boys called him for help, since there is no sign of a break-in. The husband injures one of the policemen and barricades himself in the flat with his sons and the two casualties. Despite a chief inspector inflaming things, Charlie goes in to treat the wounded and convinces the man to give himself up. It transpires the boys let the burglar into the flat while their mother was out but the husband will still face charges of illegal imprisonment. Charlie convinces him to let his wife's sister look after the boys. Jamie tells Maggie he and his sister Joanne are avoiding the house so they don't have to look after Stan. Guppy treats a young couple with a crotch rash that the woman suspects is an STI. In fact, it's an allergic reaction to washing powder, although she is unaware her boyfriend actually has cheated on her. Peter harasses Bex outside the hospital and is punched by Luke, needing treatment. He later slips away and attacks her, intending to rape her again, but she pushes him down the stairs, badly injuring him. Charlie and Luke witness it and Luke tells Bex to get out of there. Guest starring Paul Kynman, Sion Tudor Owen and Daniel Hyde
489	43	"There are Worse Things I Could Do"	Brett Fallis	Julie Blackie	16 July 2005	6.65
Peter is rushed into Resus but dies. Luke says he fell down the stairs. Maggie briefly meets with Joanne, who is organising costumes for a show at uni and is one of the understudies. Classmates Zara, Lisa and Jessica go for a drive in Jessica's mum's car, since Zara has just passed her test. However, she ends up colliding with a car driven by pregnant Valentina. Zara, who isn't insured, convinces Jessica to say she was driving. The hospital staff quickly realise cuts on her feet from the pedals mean Zara was the driver. Her father Simon tries to brush the matter under the carpet by paying for the damage, but when she learns Valentina lost the baby, Zara admits the truth. Maggie discovers the injuries mean Joanne is now performing and insists on going to the show. Ellen has returned to the hospital as an agency nurse and tells Nina that she went back to Ukraine and got her visa and the fraud charge sorted. She and Guppy meet with a woman who Jas has put on a supposed wonder drug. While Ellen diagnoses the woman's grandson with a throat infection, Guppy realises Jas has tricked the woman into taking part in a drug trial. Jas puts her back on her old medication and tells Guppy Harry knew all about it. Will turns up to investigate Peter's death but Colin gives Luke the CCTV footage of Bex pushing him and tells Will it must have been taped over. Luke, Bex and a reluctant Charlie tell Will that Bex arrived after Peter fell. Guest starring Loraine Velez, David Maybrick and Michael Lumsden
490	44	"Brief Encounters"	Jill Robertson	Catrin Clarke	23 July 2005	7.44
A boy runs in front of a kite-surfer on the beach and his mother pushes him out of the way but is hit herself; she suffers a head injury and the surfer breaks his legs. She later dies in hospital. Her sister, who has a family of her own, is reluctant to take in the boy, who has Tourette syndrome, but eventually agrees, with the surfer offering to help out. Luke and Nina refuse to enter the flat of a known drug addict without the police. It turns out the addict's younger brother is experiencing a sickle cell crisis and he takes him to the hospital himself. Harry and Charlie insist Guppy treat the brother but the addict later punches him and flees with stolen diamorphine. Guppy asks Abs to look out for peptic ulcer patients. When Harry refers a troublesome patient demanding to go private to Jas, Guppy thinks this proves Jas was telling the truth. Selena is discharged and gets back with Will. Colin warns Luke that Will is still looking into Peter's death. Luke decides to get Bex out of the country. He accompanies Claire to Peter's funeral but when he mentions Bex is leaving, Claire tells Will, who puts out a warrant for her arrest. Luke manages to get Bex to a friend's boat at the harbour and they say their goodbyes before she leaves. Guest starring Samantha Seager, Kate Dove and Patrick Regis Bex Reynolds departs.
491	45	"Aftermath"	Rhys Powys	Jason Sutton	30 July 2005	7.15
Guppy has requested a transfer and refuses to tell Harry why. A security guard, Kevin, is brought in after being stabbed and dies in Resus. Guppy tries to tell his mother Stephanie but she remains in denial, even after seeing his body. Luke and Nina are called out to a house where a boy, Liam, has deliberately burned his hands; his father Martin is constantly aggressive towards him. It transpires Liam caused Martin to crash the car, killing his mother and brother, and he has been self-harming ever since. Martin and Stephanie have a frank chat that results in Stephanie accepting Kevin's death and Martin realising he hasn't been helping Liam, having the boy taken into care while he gets himself sorted. Luke tells Claire he loved her. Abs is shocked that Kelsey Phillips, who he had thrown off her course when she was a student, is starting work next week; she identifies an elderly man who had his leg amputated as eating beetroot to discolour his urine and make it look like blood. Jamie brings Stan to the hospital so he can take a job at a garage and Maggie later finds him in reception half-dressed, having thought he was in bed at home. Guest starring Ralph Ineson, Tommy Knight and Ellen Thomas Kelsey Phillips is introduced
492	46	"You Need Friends"	Murilo Pasta	Jo O'Keefe	6 August 2005	7.05
An overweight youngster is caught stealing and eating food in a supermarket and is abandoned by his mother before collapsing. Kelsey learns he has Praeder Willi Syndrome, meaning he is constantly hungry, and he later dies of a pulmonary embolism. Two friends are making a cleaning fluid in a shed when it explodes. One of them has a shard of glass in his leg and his friend goes to get help but doesn't return and is later found collapsed in the street. When the other one's wife shows no concern for him, her husband asks her to leave. A woman comes in with a cut head having had a fall and turns out to have thrown her anti-depressants away, prompting Sam to bin his medication. However, it turns out she was trying to hang herself when she had the fall and she agrees to be admitted. Joanne has to leave Stan alone while she is at the shops and he trips and injures his shoulder. Maggie decides to put him in a home. Claire thinks Luke is in contact with Bex but he is actually getting flowers for her. However, she then finds the CCTV tape of Bex pushing Pete in his car. Guppy confronts Harry with his supposed evidence of Harry's complicity with Jas, only for an angry Harry to point out he only gives Jas a tiny proportion of referrals and has been collecting evidence against him himself. Guest starring Melanie Ramsay, Sheila Whitfield and Marlon Bulger
493	47	"Smoke & Mirrors"	Martin Sharp	Rob Hume	13 August 2005	7.53
A couple bring in their baby son after he has had a seizure and is discovered to have neonatal tetanus even though it has been eradicated in Europe. Harry, Maggie, Selena and Tess discover the mother has been given a hysterectomy without consent and she reveals she was heavily drugged during the birth. They deduce a supposed fertility clinic the pair went to actually gave them someone else's baby and convinced them it was theirs. The couple resolve to officially adopt the baby if the birth family can't be traced. A teenager comes in after binge drinking on seeing her boyfriend with another girl, attacks Selena and leaves. She is later brought back in after falling down an escalator and Kelsey is more sympathetic on learning she is only fourteen. An athlete recovering from an injury overstretches himself and his girlfriend learns he has been taking steroids for the recovery: He promises to drop them but she leaves him anyway. He helps Selena when she collapses as a result of an abscess from her previous injury. Harry goes looking for Will and finds him with Ellen. Luke proposes to Claire but she walks away from him in disgust. Guest starring Nickie Rainsford, Darren Litten and Summer Manning
494	48	"Truth, Lies & Videotape"	Terry Iland	Peter Mills	20 August 2005	7.31
A young mother brings in her baby and Ellen criticises her for feeding the baby mashed up junk food, causing nutritional problems. The girl tries to take the baby and leave but Maggie convinces her social services will just give her advice and chides Ellen for her unprofessionalism. A woman who has fallen down the stairs is horrified to learn she is pregnant. Claire mentions it to Harry in front of the woman's husband and the woman admits the pregnancy is the result of being raped by an intruder. Her husband decides to sell the house to get away from the memories and they consider keeping the baby. A woman with MS turns out to have been fed sedatives by her mother-in-law so her help will be needed. Sam gets talking with Fleur, a girl in reception, and has Kelsey keep her boyfriend Dean, who has an infected tattoo, busy while he chats her up. It becomes clear neither Fleur nor Dean really wants to be with the other; Fleur arranges a date with Sam and Kelsey one with Dean. Guppy has Woody pose as a drug rep to get Jas out of his office so he can copy his files. Harry tells Will that Selena has MRSA. Will finishes with Ellen but walks away on seeing Selena with Harry. Claire convinces Charlie and Luke to go with her to scatter Peter's ashes at the harbour, then reveals she knows the truth about how he died. She drives their car into the harbour; Luke gets Charlie to safety but Claire refuses to let him help her and drowns. Guest starring Rebecca Clay, Gary Sefton and Lenora Crichlow This Episode sees the Departure of Claire Guildford

=== Special ===
No. overall	No. in series	Title	Directed by	Written by	Original release date	Viewers (millions)
—	Special–1	"Something We Can Do (DoNation Special)"	Shani Grewal	Robert Scott-Fraser	27 August 2005	7.32
A young man, Matt, is on his way to a reunion with his estranged parents, who he hasn't seen since blaming them for his brother's suicide eleven years earlier. However, his car is hit by two other vehicles within sight of them. He is declared brain dead in hospital: His parents are in favour of his organs being donated but his pregnant wife, Sarah, is reluctant to give consent. Lucy, who has cystic fibrosis and is on the transplant list, collapses in a uni bar. Lisa brings in Tony, a friend of her father's who is also on the transplant list: He lost his wife and daughter in a car accident but now has a new girlfriend, Jean. The three families clash, with Lucy's parents furious both at the idea of the heart going to waste and of Tony getting it ahead of her, and even Lisa and Maggie argue over the patients' suitability. Sarah gives consent and, in an interactive segment, Professor Robert Winston invites viewers to vote on the recipient. Lucy gets the heart and graduates from college. Tony marries Jean in a wheelchair and remains on the transplant list. Guest starring Hywel Bennett, Annette Badland and Steven Pinder Note: This was billed as a Casualty@Holby City crossover
