= Cap Blanc =

Cap Blanc or Cape Blanc, meaning "White Cape", may refer to:

- Ras Nouadhibou or Cap Blanc, a headland in Mauritania and Western Sahara
- Cap Blanc rock shelter, a prehistoric limestone shelter in France
- Cap Blanc (Ibiza), a beach on the Spanish island of Ibiza
- Cape Blanc (Quebec), a strip of land in Quebec City, Canada

== See also ==
- Cabo Blanco (disambiguation)
- Cape Blanco (disambiguation)
