= Cabo Blanco =

Cabo Blanco may refer to:

- Cabo Blanco, Africa, a peninsula also known as Ras Nouadhibou
- Cabo Blanco, Peru, fishing village and surf spot
- Cabo Blanco, Spain, village in Arona, Spain
- Cabo Blanco, Chile, hamlet in Valdivia, Chile
- Cabo Blanco, Costa Rica, wildlife reserve
- Cabo Blanco (film), a film starring Charles Bronson

== See also ==
- Cape Blanco (disambiguation)
