= Cape Blanco =

Cape Blanco can mean:

== Places ==
- Cape Blanco (Oregon), a headland in the U.S. state of Oregon
- Ras Nouadhibou, a peninsula on the west coast of Africa

== Other uses ==
- Cape Blanco (horse), a Thoroughbred racehorse

== See also ==
- Cape Blanc (disambiguation)
- Cabo Blanco (disambiguation)
