= Cabo Blanco, Chile =

Coordinates: 39.772°S 73.246°W

Cabo Blanco
- Hamlet
- Cabo Blanco
- Interactive map of Cabo Blanco
- Country: Chile
- Region: Los Ríos
- Province: Valdivia
- Commune: Valdivia

Government
  - Alcalde: Carla Amtmann

Cabo Blanco is a Chilean hamlet (caserío) located in Valdivia, Valdivia Province, Los Ríos Region.

It was described in 1899 by Francisco Solano Asta-Buruaga y Cienfuegos on his book Diccionario Geográfico de la República de Chile as a "small and disperse hamlet". It is located west of Cruces River, and about eight kilometers from Valdivia. A nearby area is known as Chinguetué (land of the chingues).
