= The Riddle of the Sands (film) =

1979 British film

- Film poster by Brian Bysouth
- Directed by: Tony Maylam
- Written by: John Bailey; Tony Maylam
- Based on: The Riddle of the Sands by Erskine Childers
- Produced by: Drummond Challis
- Starring: Michael York; Simon MacCorkindale; Jenny Agutter
- Cinematography: Christopher Challis
- Edited by: Peter Hollywood
- Music by: Howard Blake
- Production company: Worldmark Productions
- Distributed by: Rank Film Distributors
- Release date: 16 March 1979 (UK)
- Running time: 99 minutes
- Country: United Kingdom
- Language: English
- Budget: £1 million

The Riddle of the Sands is a 1979 British spy thriller cinema film based upon the novel of the same name written by Erskine Childers. Set in 1901, and starring Michael York, Simon MacCorkindale and Jenny Agutter, it concerns the efforts of two British yachtsmen to avert a plot by the German Empire to launch a seaborne military invasion of the United Kingdom.

== Plot ==
In the autumn of 1901, Carruthers, an aristocratic junior official in the British Foreign Office, is invited on a yachting and duck-shooting holiday by an old University acquaintance called Arthur Davies. On Carruthers' arrival on Germany's northern coast to join the yacht Dulcibella, Davies explains to him that he has a hidden agenda for the trip and the invitation beyond duck-hunting.

While boating around the Frisian Islands ostensibly correcting antiquated British sea charts of the coastline's shifting topography, by chance he had met a retired German sailor called Dollmann on the yacht Medusa with his wife and daughter, Clara, with whom Davies has initiated a romantic attachment. He narrates further that whilst sailing together along the coast in a gale Dollmann had, when Davies had tried to put into a particular estuary for shelter, inexplicably prevented him from entering by executing a deliberately hazardous sea-manoeuvre, to the degree that both their lives had been endangered by it.

Davies then reveals to Carruthers that his real interest in the area is that he suspects that the Imperial German Navy is engaged in covert military activity of some nature in the Frisian Islands, with the intention of threatening the security of the North Sea from the British perspective, which the Royal Navy is strategically misdirected to meet, and he is engaged in trying to discover what it is. This the pretext of the "holiday" that he has invited Carruthers upon, given Carruthers' ability to speak German along with his professional contacts within Whitehall, if they should discover something warranting the alarm being raised within the halls of the British Government.

Carruthers and Davies go on, amidst cryptic warnings-off from circling German naval officers, sailing expeditions among the Frisian isles and inlets, and fights, to carry out covert surveillance at the estuary in question, to discover that the German Empire is using a naval base hidden in the islands to carry out rehearsals for a seaborne passage across the North Sea of a German army with the aim of militarily invading Britain, and that Herr "Dollmann" is in fact Lieutenant Thomas, an embittered former Royal Navy officer who is treasonously assisting their preparations with his detailed knowledge of the British coast and key naval defences.

After sabotaging one of the rehearsals, whilst escaping to the Netherlands by sea in two roped yachts with the information about it, along with a badly wounded Dollmann and his family as prisoners, Davies abandons Dollmann with his wife in the Dulcibella to allow him to return to Germany to seek medical attention for his wounds at the insistence of Clara, who agrees to accompany Davies and Carruthers back to Britain in the Medusa with his papers revealing the German plans in detail. Dollmann and his wife are murdered by the pursuing German authorities — led by Kaiser Wilhelm II, in person — when the Dulcibella is rammed and destroyed.

The film ends with the yacht bearing Carruthers, Davies and Clara bound for the Netherlands, with a Carruthers' voiced narration detailing how their return to Britain with the information would lead to a shift in the United Kingdom's sea defence strategy towards Germany, that would avert the threat of war by tactical deterrent.

== Cast ==
- Michael York as Charles Carruthers
- Simon MacCorkindale as Arthur Davies
- Jenny Agutter as Clara Dollmann
- Alan Badel as Dollmann
- Michael Sheard as Böehme
- Hans Meyer as Grimm
- Wolf Kahler as Kaiser Wilhelm II
- Olga Lowe as Frau Dollmann
- Jurgen Andersen as Von Brüning
- Ronald Markham as Withers

== Production ==
=== Development and scripting ===
Several producers and directors had tried to make a film based on the novel but the Childers family had not wanted to sell the rights. This ceased to be a problem when the novel passed into the public domain.

Tony Maylam and Drummond Challis, son of photographer Christopher Challis, formed a production company to make the film and succeeded in raising the finance from the Rank Organisation, who had recently decided to get back into film production, prompted by the success of Murder on the Orient Express (1974). Additional finance was provided by the National Film Finance Corporation. It was the feature film debut for both Challis and Maylam. Rank announced the project in January 1978 as part of a slate of films worth £8 million.

The script was basically faithful to the novel although some details and the ending were changed. Maylam thought the novel "had a rather more anti-climactic ending, and we felt a more up-beat ending was essential for a feature film. But we feel it is still very much in the Childers style."

Among the changes were the inclusion of the Kaiser (although his presence at the trial towing of the lighter is hinted at in the book) and the fate of the character of Dollman (in the original novel he drowned himself; in the film he is mortally wounded after being shot, then killed when the Germans ram his yacht).

Maylam:

The failing of the book is that Dollman falls apart as a character in the last chapter. In one breath he is a total opportunist who would do anything for his grand plan. The next moment he is a defeated man. I believe he was an opportunist to the bitter end. Oh, the purists will have a go at me, definitely, but in all other respects we have strived to remain faithful to the book. Without bastardising the story, we are making the characters more defined and the ending is now much more believable and exciting.

=== Filming ===
Filming was done in the Netherlands, West Germany and at Bushey Studios, Hertfordshire, England. Many scenes were shot on the Frisian Islands on the North Sea coast of Germany and the Netherlands, the same locale as in the book.

The unit was partly based in the town of Enkhuizen in the Netherlands; although that town had no relevance to the novel, its harbour provided easy access to the Zuider Zee where the unit could shoot sailing sequences all day unhampered by tidal delays. Many of the crew lived on board a cruiser during the shoot because it was cheaper than staying in local accommodation, of which there was a shortage. The train scenes are filmed between Twisk and Medemblik (Bensersiel and Emden in the film respectively) on the track and in the carriages of the Hoorn–Medemblik heritage railway.

Several scenes were also shot in the German village of Greetsiel. The sequence of Carruthers and Davies navigating their way between sandbanks in the Frisian Islands was shot on Frensham Ponds in Surrey with the aid of nine large fog machines; this was done because the tidal flows and sands of the Frisian Islands would have made actually filming there very difficult.

While filming on the Johanna Lucretia, playing the Medusa, cinematographer Christopher Challis and camera operator John Palmer would hold the camera in place with slings of rope and elastic, soaking up the ship's motion and allowing the operator free rein. This technique was developed by Challis and Palmer when they made The Deep (1977).

Davies' boat, the Dulcibella, was converted from an Isle of Wight lifeboat.

The film was Tony Maylam's feature film debut. He said during filming:

So much rests on this picture. It's very important to prove myself. I owe a big debt to people like Alan Parker and Ridley Scott, who proved to the film establishment that a young film director can get it all together and deliver. If this is a commercial and artistic success it can only help my generation of filmmakers. My motto is compromise under pressure. One hopes one doesn't have to compromise too much. But let's face it, the whole of life's a compromise.

During filming, Michael York took an option for the film rights on a biography of Erskine Childers, The Zeal of the Convert by Burke Wilkinson. This film was never made.

== Reception ==
=== Box office ===
The film was not the hoped for success at the box office and was one of the last films financed by the Rank Organisation.

In February 1980 the Rank Organisation reported the losses on Eagle's Wing, The Lady Vanishes and Riddle of the Sands would be £2-3 million, contributing to an overall loss to Rank that year of £1.5 million.

In the United States, the film was released in April 1984.

=== Critical ===
The critic from the Observer called the film "an affectionate, commendably straight adaptation... the excitement somewhat abates in the perfunctorily handled scenes ashore... the cinematographer Christopher Challis uses the Panavision screen to fine dramatic effect." The Guardian also praised the cinematography but complained "the set pieces are none too convincing and the whole regrettably lacks the eye for detail that could have made it into an entirely convincing period piece."

Alexander Walker of the Evening Standard said it "wasn't meant to be a children's film but that's how it looked - and it cost several hundreds of thousands of pounds, too much for that kind of film."

The New York Times called the film a "slow but affable period piece" while the Los Angeles Times said it "has the quaint, old fashioned sound of a Hardy Boys mystery about it" which "plays like a slightly more lethal boys' adventure story."

Filmink argued "to be honest, this film should have been made years ago – preferably in the ‘30s or ‘50s" but the delay "meant that the movie could be shot in gorgeous Panavision, in colour, and heavily on location" and the movie "looks terrific, with its windswept North Sea locations, small coastal towns and sand bars. The film’s main problem is that it doesn’t differentiate enough between the lead characters and is perhaps too restful. But it was made with a lot of love and was a tribute to Rank. It’s a shame that it didn’t do well at the box office but it’s had a long life."

== See also ==
- Das Rätsel der Sandbank (1985 West German TV miniseries)
