= Cap Blanc (Ibiza) =

Beach in Ibiza, Balearic Islands, Spain

- Beach
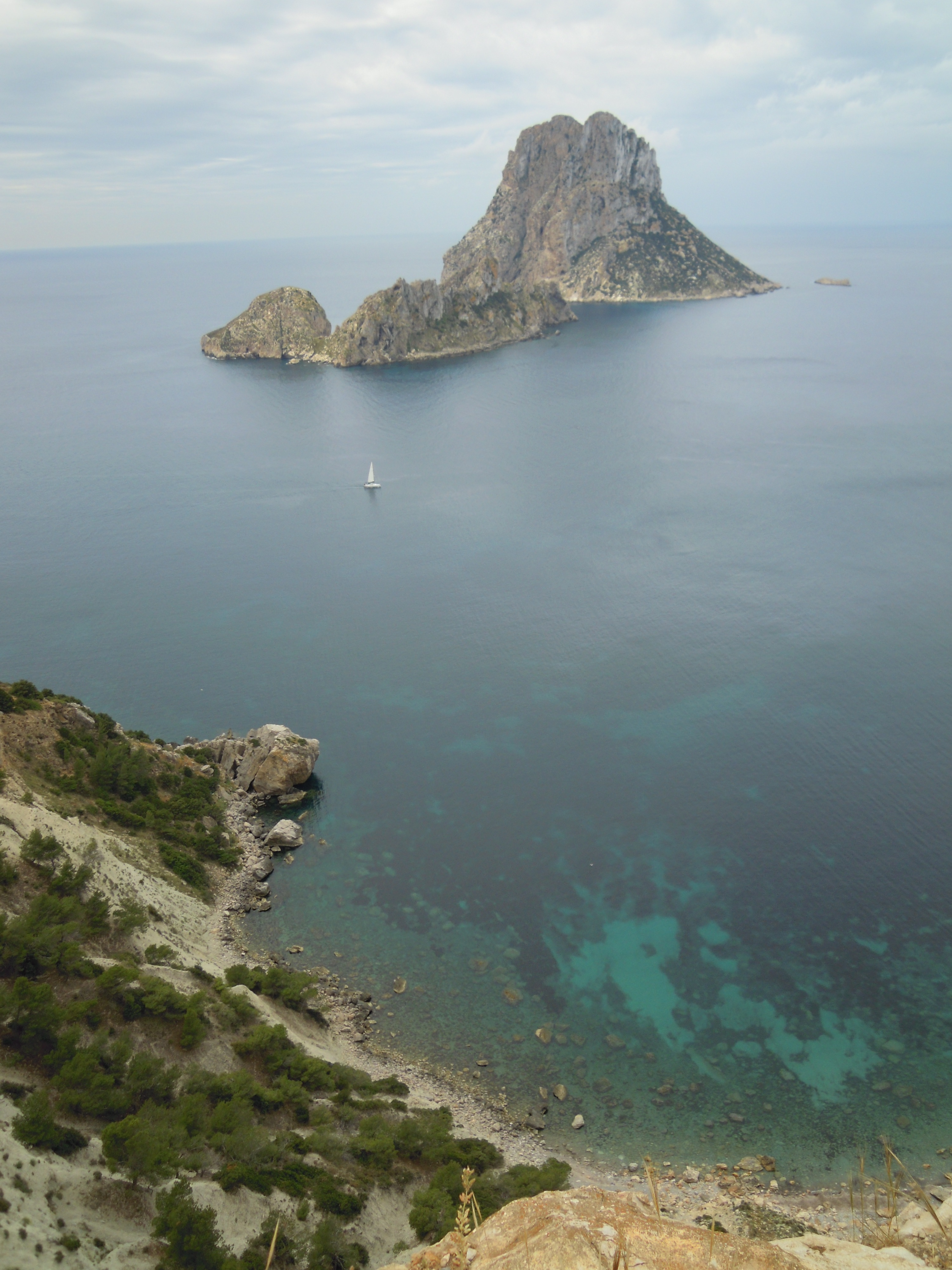
- The beach below Cap Blanc

- Location of Cap Blanc on Ibiza
- Coordinates: 38°52′24″N 1°13′22″E
- Location: Sant Josep de sa Talaia, Balearic Islands, Spain

Cap Blanca is a beach on the western seaboard of the Spanish island of Ibiza. The Beach has a good view of the rock island of Es Vedrà which lies a little of the coast here. The beach is in the municipality of Sant Josep de sa Talaia and is 13.3 miles (21.4 km) west of the town of Ibiza town. The village of Sant Josep de sa Talaia is 7.0 miles (11.3 km) east of the beach.

== Description ==
This small pebbly beach is a difficult place to reach but the views of Es Vedrà are well worth the exertion to get there. The steep final descent path is difficult and even though there are ropes to help a steady descent, great care is needed. The beach is backed by cliffs of Cap Blanca, behind which are the pine clad hillsides of the Serra de Ses Roques Altes and Sa Talaiassa, the highest peak on the island. This area of the island has protected status and encompasses the Cala d'Hort Nature Reserve. As a result of this status, there are no developments along this stretch of coast, leaving an unspoiled and natural environment.

== Gallery ==
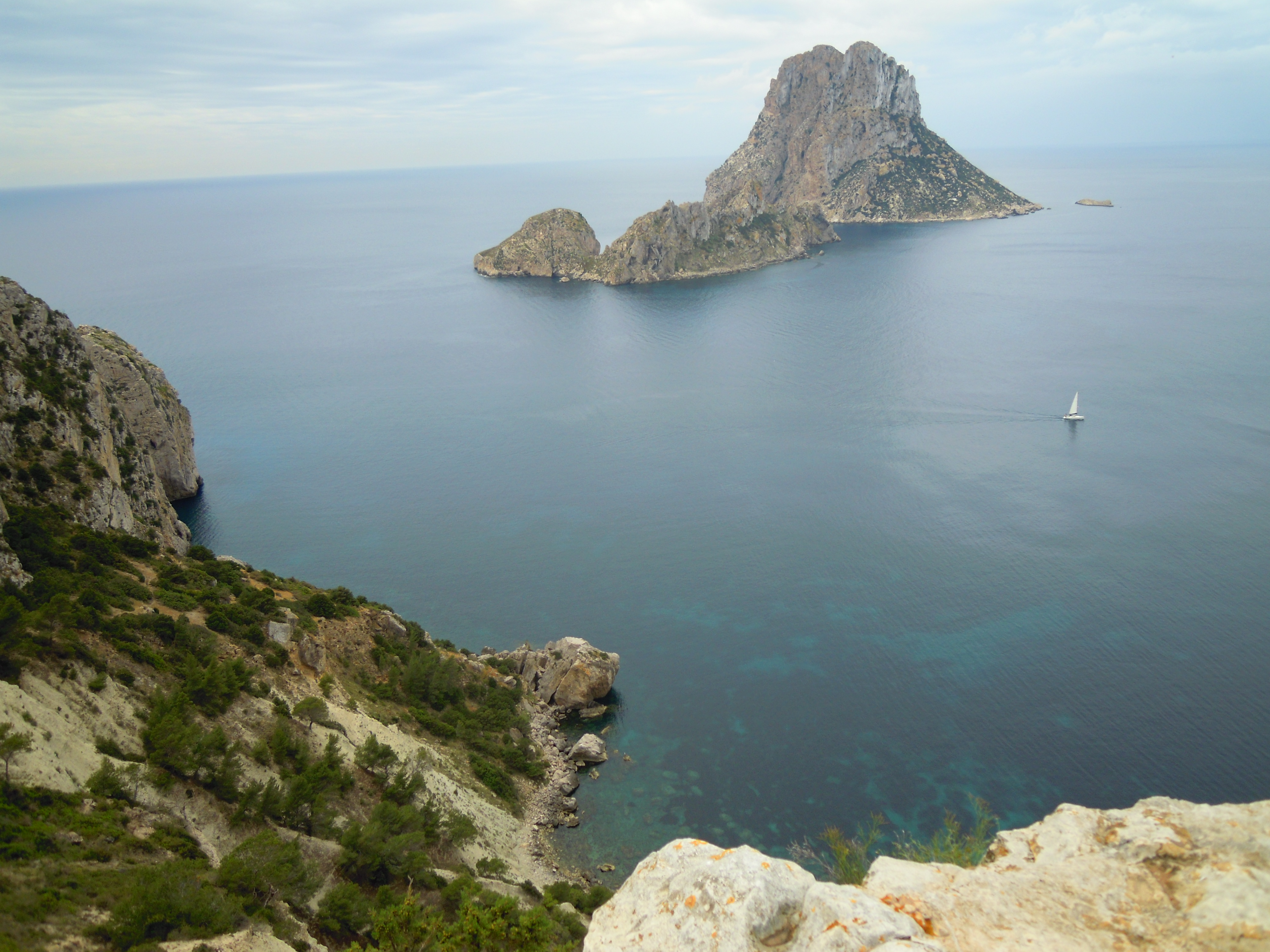
