= Chinguetué =

- Area
- Chinguetué
- Country: Chile
- Region: Los Ríos
- Province: Valdivia
- Commune: Valdivia

Chinguetué is a Chilean area located in Valdivia, Valdivia Province, Los Ríos Region. It was described in 1899 by Francisco Solano Asta-Buruaga y Cienfuegos on his book Diccionario Geográfico de la República de Chile as a "very productive area". Chinguetué means "land of chingues".
