= Casualty@Holby City =

British television series

- Still from the opening titles of Casualty@Holby City
- Genre: Medical drama
- Created by: Mervyn Watson; Tony McHale
- Country of origin: United Kingdom
- No. of episodes: 9

Original release
- Network: BBC One
- Release: 26 December 2004 – 27 December 2005

Related
- Casualty; Holby City

Casualty@Holby City (stylised as CASUAL+Y @ HOLBY CI+Y) is a series of special crossover episodes of BBC medical dramas Casualty and Holby City. While Casualty was launched on 6 September 1986, and its spin-off Holby City was first aired on 12 January 1999, the first full crossover episode between the two programmes was not broadcast until 26 December 2004. As of 27 December 2005, four crossover specials have been aired, comprising nine episodes total. Although further crossovers of storylines and characters have since occurred, they have not been broadcast under the Casualty@Holby City title.

== Production ==
The suggestion to produce the first Casualty and Holby City crossover originated from a member of the BBC comedy department. The station's Controller of Drama approved of the idea and had the crossover commissioned, spearheaded by Casualty's executive producer Mervyn Watson, and Holby City's Tony McHale. The writer and producer for the first, two-part crossover were selected from the Holby City crew. Logistical difficulties arose from the fact the two series are usually produced 120 miles apart, with Casualty based in Bristol and Holby City in Elstree. Both series are usually in continuous production 52 weeks a year, so in order to produce the first crossover, work on both shows has to be halted for two weeks to release a number of cast members to appear in the special. Once regular production began again, the availability of cast members set to appear in the crossover was limited, and both series had to rely for the most part on the remaining characters who were not in the special. Filming took six weeks to complete, and occurred for the most part at Casualty's emergency department in Bristol. Additional filming took place at the Holby City set in Elstree, as well as the Queen Elizabeth Hospital for Children, a Barratts office block in Brentford and an ex-MOD tank testing site in Chobham. A theme tune was devised, consisting of both the Casualty and Holby City theme tunes played over one another in sync. Terry Ramsey of the Evening Standard described it as "shambolic", opining: "it sounds like it was produced with The Big Boy's Box of Sound Mixing software by a seven-year-old on Christmas Day while playing his PlayStation with the other hand."

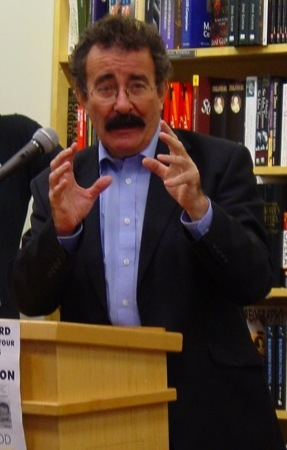
Robert Winston hosts the interactive episode "Something We Can Do".

A second crossover was commissioned in 2005 as part of the BBC's DoNation season. In August 2005, the station ran a week-long campaign to raise public awareness of organ donation, aiming to help viewers make an informed decision about whether to sign up to the Organ Donation Register. An interactive episode of Casualty@Holby City was one of the headlining shows of the season, allowing viewers to vote by phone to determine the outcome of a fictional organ donation. The episode was part documentary, and a segment presented by Robert Winston both detailed the guidelines for matching organ donors with recipients, and dispelled common myths about organ donation. Viewers were then invited to vote for one of two characters to receive a heart transplant. 98,800 viewers voted, with a 65 percent majority favouring that the organ be received by Lucy, a young cystic fibrosis patient, over Tony, a widow twenty years her senior. Two different endings were filmed, to account for both possible outcomes of the public vote. The alternative ending was made available on the Casualty@Holby City DoNation Interactive website.

The third Casualty@Holby City crossover was aired in October 2005, two months after the interactive special. The four-part storyline tackled the issue of youth violence, following the events of a turbulent A&E demonstration at an inner-city school. The crossover was broadcast in the same week that the BBC launched a new adaptation of Charles Dickens' Bleak House starring Gillian Anderson and Charles Dance, and Phil and Grant Mitchell returned to the station's soap opera EastEnders. BBC1 controller Peter Fincham explained: "We have got three very different dramas playing this week that emphasise the breadth and depth of what we have to offer. Changing the scheduling of established favourites and the format for presenting period drama is exactly what I want BBC1 to be doing, challenging our audiences with top quality programming."

Based on the success of the 2004 Casualty@Holby City Christmas special, another crossover was ordered for Christmas 2005. Rather than dividing the episodes between the two series' crews as had previously been standard, this crossover operated as an entirely separate production, with Diana Kyle producing and Paul Harrison directing. A large proportion of the crossover was filmed in a road tunnel in Caernarfon, Wales. Watson commented: "It was the only one that we could hire for two weeks without causing huge traffic jams. The whole shoot was five weeks long. Staging stunts like car accidents is difficult and stressful at the best of times, but doing all that in a tunnel doubled it. The great advantage was that there was no problem with the weather, it was a totally controlled environment with excellent parking facilities for the unit, and a warm welcome from the locals, which is always nice."

== Characters and cast ==
=== Main characters ===
Casualty@Holby City focuses on the medical staff at Holby General, with main roles filled by regular Casualty and Holby City cast members. The first crossover, broadcast in December 2004, features Casualty's emergency medicine consultant Harry Harper (Simon MacCorkindale), consultant paediatrician Jim Brodie (Maxwell Caulfield), Clinical Nurse Manager Tess Bateman (Suzanne Packer), paramedics Luke Warren (Matthew Wait) and Josh Griffiths (Ian Bleasdale) and receptionist Bex Reynolds (Sarah Manners). Holby City characters who appear are cardiothoracic consultant Connie Beauchamp (Amanda Mealing), general surgical consultant Ric Griffin (Hugh Quarshie), midwife Rosie Sattar (Kim Vithana), obstetrics registrar Mubbs Hussein (Ian Aspinall), staff nurse Donna Jackson (Jaye Jacobs), and cardiac consultant Alistair Taylor (Dominic Jephcott).

The interactive episode again stars MacCorkindale, Bleasdale, Packer and Wait. Additional Casualty characters who appear are paramedic Comfort Jones (Martina Laird), senior staff nurse Abs Denham (James Redmond), Emergency Medical Technician Nina Farr (Rebekah Gibbs) and specialist registrar Maggie Coldwell (Susan Cookson). Holby City's critical care consultant Lola Griffin (Sharon D. Clarke) and matron Lisa Fox (Luisa Bradshaw-White) also star.

The four-part October 2005 crossover again stars MacCorkindale, Bleasdale, Packer, Wait, Laird, Redmond, Gibbs, Mealing and Quarshie. It also features Casualty's paramedic Paul "Woody" Joyner (Will Thorp), staff nurse Kelsey Phillips (Janine Mellor), senior staff nurse Bruno Jenkins (Mark Bonnar), neurology associate specialist Selena Donovan (Elizabeth Carling) and SHO Guppy Sandhu (Elyes Gabel). Holby City characters who appear are registrar Diane Lloyd (Patricia Potter), matron Chrissie Williams (Tina Hobley), consultant obstetrician Owen Davis (Mark Moraghan), medical student Matt Parker (Adam Best), staff nurse Tricia Williams (Sharon Maughan) and cardiothoracic consultant Ed Loftwood (Graeme Garden).

"Deny Thy Father", the two-part December 2005 crossover, stars Casualty's MacCorkindale, Bleasdale, Packer, Wait, Cookson, Thorp, Mellor and Carling, as well as Clinical Nurse Specialist Charlie Fairhead (Derek Thompson) and receptionist Sam Bateman (Luke Bailey). Mealing, Quarshie, Jacobs and Clarke of the Holby City cast also star, along with general surgical registrar Nick Jordan (Michael French) and midwife Mickie Hendrie (Kelly Adams). Thorp's character was killed off during the second episode. The actor praised the crossover, commenting: "Filming it was like filming a feature film. Massive stunts and good storylines. There was a really good buzz on set all the time... As an actor, you couldn't wish for a better exit. It was absolutely brilliant."

=== Guest stars ===
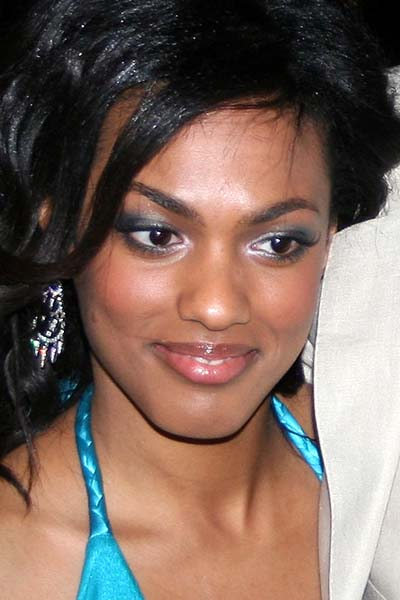
Freema Agyeman guest-stars in the first Casualty@Holby City crossover.

The crossover episodes include numerous guest stars, typically as patients and their friends and relatives. In the December 2004 crossover, John McArdle and Kerry Peers play husband and wife Frank and Sarah Morgan, whose daughter Danielle (Zoe Morgan) receives a heart transplant. René Zagger appears as Bob Smith, a tanker driver who crashes into the hospital, and Nicola Stapleton plays his wife Shirley. Freema Agyeman plays Kate Hindley, a patient trapped under rubble following the collision, and Keith-Lee Castle appears as isolation ward doctor Phil. Annette Badland and Hywel Bennett guest-star in "Something We Can Do" as Wendy and David Winters, whose son Matt (David Alderman) dies following a car accident. Emily Hamilton acts as his wife Sarah. Steven Pinder plays Tony Harvey, a potential recipient of Matt's donated heart, and Nina Wadia appears as his girlfriend Jean. Yvonne O'Grady plays Carol Beddows, whose daughter Lucy (Sarah Bedi) is also a potential recipient. The interactive segment of the episode is presented by Robert Winston.

In the four-part Halloween crossover, James Gaddas guest-stars as Carl O'Leary, the headmaster of a failing school. James Pearson plays Adrian Lucas, a pupil who puts acid in the water used in apple bobbing. Jason Maza appears as Kris Burrows, whose girlfriend Emma Blakely (Kate Scott) is burned by the acid, and Red Madrell plays Shania Campbell, Emma's best friend who is also burned. Regé-Jean Page (credited as Rege Page) appears as Daniel Kimpton, a friend of Kris' who hijacks an ambulance. Ade Sapara appears as Edgar Muzenda, a poet and political refugee involved in a car accident, and Nikki Amuka-Bird plays his pregnant wife Moji. Louis Mahoney appears as their friend Raymond Opoku. The December 2005 crossover features Iain Fletcher as fire officer Iain Bain, Julia Hills as Woody's mother Caroline Joyner, Fiona Glascott as Tara Doyle, a girl trapped when a tunnel collapses, and Gary Whelan as Tara's father Bernie.

== Episodes ==
No.	Episode	Directed by	Written by	Original release date	UK viewers (millions)
1	"Casualty@Holby City: Part One"	Michael Offer	Johanne McAndrew	26 December 2004	8.91
Rushing to attend the birth of his child, a fuel tanker driver crashes into Holby General's Acute Assessment Unit. Immediate evacuation of the hospital is begun, as the tanker leaks petrol into the hospital basement. The driver's wife delivers a mixed-race son, who is identifiably the result of an extra-marital affair, as she and her husband are both white. The driver dies unaware of his wife's infidelity, and as the baby begins to experience breathing difficulties, his mother rejects him, leaving him with midwife Rosie Sattar. Rosie calls on consultant paediatrician Jim Brodie for help. Medical director Connie Beauchamp and cardiac consultant Alistair Taylor are forced to complete open heart surgery on a child as the evacuation continues, held hostage by the child's father.Paramedic Luke Warren fails to spot the deadly symptoms of a student with Lassa fever, and receptionist Bex Reynolds is lured up to Nightingale Wing pharmacy by a fake pharmaceutical representative. As the generator is switched off in the basement, the petrol explodes and the Nightingale building bursts into flames, trapping numerous staff members inside.
2	"Casualty@Holby City: Part Two"	Michael Offer	Johanne McAndrew	28 December 2004	8.82
As firefighters struggle to contain the aftermath of the explosion, Connie is joined in theatre by Harry as they continue the transplant by torchlight. Rosie and Jim manage to get the baby to safety, but as debris falls, Rosie is impaled on a piece of metal. Bex, having been trapped under rubble and abandoned by the fake pharmaceutical representative, is discovered by firemen and carried to safety. Alistair abandons the transplant and jumps from a fifth floor window. Critically injured, he talks nurse Donna Jackson through a life saving procedure on another patient before dying. Inside the building, Jim removes the metal pole from Rosie's abdomen, and all those still trapped in the building congregate in the hospital's isolation room. From outside, consultant Ric Griffin guides Connie to a maintenance corridor and bridge which will lead those trapped to a point where firefighters are waiting for them. The bridge is in a state of near collapse and the floor below is engulfed with flames, but one by one, the group make it across. Rosie is last to cross, helped by Jim and Harry. Suddenly, the fake pharmaceutical representative rushes across behind them, damaging the bridge further and falling to his death. Jim and Rosie are left hanging from the broken bridge, holding on to one of Harry's arms each. Knowing Harry will unable to hold both their weight for much longer, Jim saves Rosie's life by letting go, also falling to his death.
3	"Something We Can Do"	Shani S. Grewal	Steve Lightfoot	27 August 2005	7.32
Three patients are introduced: Matt, a thirty-year-old man involved in a road traffic accident, who arrives at Holby General having suffered significant head trauma and is later pronounced brain-stem dead; Lucy, a nineteen-year-old student who has cystic fibrosis and is awaiting a heart and lung transplant, and Tony, a forty-one-year-old ex-smoker in the end stages of heart failure, who is also in need of a transplant. While Matt's parents and pregnant wife deliberate over the decision to donate his organs, Lucy's father and Tony's fiance create conflict amongst the staff over which patient is more deserving of a transplant. The episode includes a documentary segment, with Robert Winston narrating on the subject of real life transplants. Testimonies are provided by Don MacKechnie, an emergency department consultant, Anne Sutcliffe, an anaesthetics and intensive care specialist, Chris Rudge, medical director for NHS UK Transplant, as well as Eamonn and Erika Phillipson, parents of Andrew, a nine-year-old donor. Presented with all the facts, viewers are asked to vote for the patient they wish to receive the transplant. As the episode ends, it is revealed that of 98,800 votes received, 65% selected Lucy to receive the donor heart. Lucy is seen happy and healthy, graduating from university having recovered well from the transplant, while Tony is revealed to have married despite his condition, and remain awaiting a new heart.
4	"Teacher's Pet"	Rob Evans	Jason Sutton	24 October 2005	5.56
Paramedics Josh Griffiths and Comfort Jones give a demonstration at Farmead Secondary School. The pupils are rowdy and non-co-operative, and headmaster Carl O'Leary apologises for their behaviour. As the paramedics prepare to leave, Comfort walks in on teacher Nick Bond kissing one of his sixteen-year-old pupils, Emma. As the school's Halloween disco gets underway, Emma and her friend Shania are talked into apple bobbing by fellow pupil Adrian. Unknown to them, Adrian has spiked the bobbing water with acid, and both are badly burned. As they receive emergency treatment, Emma calls out for Nick, leading her boyfriend Kris to discover her infidelity. He and his friends attack their teacher, leaving him badly beaten. Comfort and fellow paramedic Luke Warren begin to transport him to Holby General's emergency department when Kris's gang hijack the ambulance, kicking Luke out and taking Comfort and Nick hostage. Meanwhile, the ED staff deal with a patient with Parkinson's disease, and the case of a sword swallowing gone wrong.
5	"Crash and Burn"	Rob Evans	Jason Sutton	25 October 2005	5.96
The youth gang joyride in Comfort's ambulance, while Kris continues his assault on Nick. When Comfort tries to intervene, he attacks her as well. Josh catches up with them and forces the vehicle to slow down, but the boy at the wheel loses control and crashes into a nearby car. The car's occupants are distinguished poet Edgar Muzenda and his wife Moji. Edgar suffers from cardiomyopathy and needs treatments following the crash. When transferred to the emergency department, Moji discovers that she is pregnant. Adrian arrives at the hospital, concerned about the condition of Emma and Shania. When Carl suspects he may have been behind the acid attack, he panics and threatens the staff in resus with a vial of acid. Carl tackles him and no one is injured. Although Comfort initially appears to be only superficially wounded from the attack in the ambulance, she is later found collapsed and barely conscious in the department staff room.
6	"Test Your Metal"	Rob Evans	Suzie Smith	26 October 2005	4.57
Comfort is rushed into theatre and operated on by Diane Lloyd, Ric Griffin and Matt Parker. They discover that she was stabbed during the attack, but manage to stabilise her condition. Kris arrives at the hospital and becomes angered when Emma reveals she is leaving him for Nick. She also mentions that Adrian was behind the attack on her, prompting Kris to makes his way to the Intensive Care Unit, where he finds Adrian at Nick's bedside. He discovers that Adrian's motivation for the attack was a crush on their teacher, and threatens him with a blade. Elsewhere, Edgar's heart condition is treated by Connie Beauchamp, who commends a risky but pioneering procedure.
7	"A Great Leap Forward"	Rob Evans	Suzie Smith	27 October 2005	5.64
Carl and Diane talk Kris into surrendering his weapon. Carl agrees to let him speak with Emma once more before involving the police, and Emma reveals that the headmaster had known about her affair with Nick all along. Feeling betrayed, Kris attacks Carl in the toilets, leaving him for dead. Edgar receives his operation, and tells Moji of his plans to return to Africa. She reveals her pregnancy to him, and tells him she will not return to the country which saw him imprisoned and her badly beaten. However, when a mutual friend from their home country reveals that his family have been murdered, she agrees that they should return and fight for stability. Although Carl is quickly discovered by Adrian, and rushed into theatre by Diane and Matt, he dies during surgery. Now wanted for murder, Kris makes his way up to the hospital roof, but is eventually talked down by Josh. As the episode ends, Matt apologises to Diane for his uncertainty throughout the tough day, and she agrees to be his mentor.
8	"Deny Thy Father: Part One"	Paul Harrison	Al Hunter Ashton & Pete Hambly	24 December 2005	8.00
Consultants Ric Griffin and Harry Harper interview candidates for a locum general surgery position, including former staff member Nick Jordan. In need of a lift to the staff Christmas party, nurse Kelsey Phillips persuades Nick to take her spare ticket to the event, in exchange for driving her, fellow nurse Donna Jackson, and paramedic Woody Joyner there. Nurse Charlie Fairhead and his new girlfriend Helen are already in attendance at the party, however when Charlie receives a phone call informing him his son has run away, he is forced to head home. Elsewhere in Holby, taxi driver Bernie Doyle drives his car into a rival taxi company's office. Mitch Campbell, owner of the company, suffers an angina attack, while Bernie injures his wrist. Both men are unhappy that Bernie's daughter, Tara, and Mitch's son, Lee, are dating. Sean Doyle, Bernie's son, locks his sister in his taxi and heads home while Lee gives chase. The car chase causes an accident in a tunnel and Charlie, Nick, Woody, Donna, and Kelsey all end up trapped. Helen suffers a collar bone fracture and is unable to leave the car, so Kelsey sits with her, despite having an intense fear of the dark. Nick tends to Tara, and argues with Charlie over whether they should amputate her leg. Woody and Donna find a man trapped in a car with his infant son. Outside the tunnel Selena Donovan, who was on her way to the party, single handedly copes until the emergency services arrive and watches on in horror as the entrance collapses, dashing attempts to rescue those trapped inside.
9	"Deny Thy Father: Part Two"	Paul Harrison	Gaby Chiappe	27 December 2005	8.86
One of the casualties confesses to possessing stolen toxic chemicals, which have started to leak. Those trapped inside quickly become engulfed by the noxious fumes. Woody finds one of the canisters underneath the car with the baby in. He picks it up and attempts to run out of harm's way with it, however ends up breathing in a fatal dose of fumes and dies in resus. Donna remains with the father and baby, and fulfills the father's dying wish by contacting his parents so that they can meet their grandson. Charlie is re-united with Louis, but Helen breaks up with him, believing that Louis is not ready for him to be in a relationship yet. Tara insists that she will not have her leg amputated, and Nick successfully performs a different procedure instead. At the hospital, Lee is in need of an operation, however Sean lies to him that Tara died, causing him to refuse treatment. Nick reveals the truth, and the feuding families attempt to reconcile. Ric, who has been impressed by Nick's performance, offers him a registrar position, however Nick turns it down, believing he is deserving of a consultancy.

== Reception ==
=== Critical response ===
Casualty@Holby City episodes have received mixed reviews from critics. Terry Ramsey of the Evening Standard selected the first episode as a televisual "Pick of the Day". The inaugural crossover was named one of the "Best TV shows for Christmas & New Year" in The Mirror, receiving generally favourable reviews by Mirror writers Jane Simon and Jim Shelley—despite the former lambasting the realism of the plot: "The building collapses, there's a little girl upstairs about to have a heart transplant, the tanker's leaking fuel and there's a velociraptor loose in radiology. Sorry, I made that last one up."—and the latter commenting that "Casualty@Holby City was deeply weird, like watching Casualty on acid." Similarly, Daniel Davies of The Western Mail also selected the episodes as dramatic highlights of the Christmas season, despite going on to discuss the aptness of the BBC's press release describing the two episodes as "thrown together."

Other reviews were more openly negative, with Charlie Brooker of The Guardian describing the episodes as "two virtually identical and rubbish shitcasts for the price of one." Frances Traynor of the Daily Record commented similarly that: "It can be quite difficult to tell these medical drama twins apart. After all, they're both rubbish", while the Liverpool Echo's Paddy Shennan suggested "the blood should instead be flowing in the BBC boardroom" for commissioning the crossover. Thomas Sutcliffe of The Independent called the crossover "the funniest programme on television", with a "sublimely cloth-eared script", describing it as: "A masterpiece of sustained comic timing [which] had this casual viewer of the dramas that spawned it scrabbling wildly for an explanatory hypothesis."

The interactive episode was deemed "a horrible mess" by Shelley, while Garry Bushell of The People kept his criticism brief, limiting his review to: "Casualty@Holby City? Takings up@pub." Paul Hoggart of The Times was dubious about the episode's purported "interactive" element, given the limited choices involved. He commented: "The twin hospital dramas have never been afraid of didactic storylines, but this example, constructed to illustrate the ethical dilemmas of those involved, is about as didactic as it gets. Let's hope this benevolent propaganda works."

The four crossover episodes which broadcast in November 2005 were generally well received by the press. The opening episode was a recommended "TV Choice" of The Daily Telegraph's Chris Riley, a "Pick of the Day" of The Mirror's Simon, and a "Pick of the Night" of the Evening Standard's Ramsey. The crossover was also a "Drama Choice" of Sarah Moolla of The People, who commented that: "There's something weirdly thrilling when these two medical shows collide."

The Christmas 2005 episodes were less favourable received, described by David Chater of The Times as: "Intentionally or not [...] one of the comic highlights of Christmas." Paul English of the Daily Record deemed the crossover: "Two turkeys for the price of one", while Terry Ramsey of The Evening Standard wrote that: "even by Casualty and Holby City standards, this one is boringly formulaic. A monotoned, badly paced, cornily written, unexciting (despite its most desperate efforts), predictable, high-pitch squeal of a drama. For die-hard fans only." The Daily Post were more positive, stating that the episodes "will have Casualty and Holby City fans glued to their TV sets over the festive period."

=== Ratings ===
The December 2004 Casualty@Holby City crossover received strong ratings. The first episode averaged 8.91 million viewers, making it the third most watched terrestrial programme of the day. The second episode was watched by 8.82 million viewers, making it the second highest rated terrestrial programme of the day. The interactive donation episode, "Something We Can Do", attained 7.32 million viewers, again making it the second most watched terrestrial programme of the day, and also the BBC's second best rated programme of the week, behind only EastEnders.

The October 2005 episodes received the lowest ratings of any Casualty@Holby City crossover to date. On its opening night, the show was watched by 5.56 million viewers, in contrast to the ITV soap opera Emmerdale, which were shown in the same timeslot and attained 9.1 million viewers. The remainder of the Halloween crossover received similarly low ratings, with the second episode watched by 5.96 million viewers, the third instalment by 4.57 million viewers, and the concluding episode by 5.64 million viewers. The fourth Casualty@Holby City crossover saw a ratings revival, with the third episode watched by 8 million viewers, making it the third most watched terrestrial programme of the day, and the second episode watched by 8.82 million viewers, becoming the second most watched terrestrial programme of the day.

== Future ==
Asked about the potential for future crossover episodes, Watson stated in 2005: "We can't guarantee any crossovers for next year, but the audience likes them. And as long as the controller of BBC One wants them, then we'll be happy to oblige." In November 2007, Kyle re-iterated that the separate series' 52-week filming schedules make it logistically difficult to produce crossovers, but revealed that the production teams were trying to create more opportunities for the two shows to merge. A new set of crossover episodes written by Casualty's lead writer Mark Catley were planned for February 2010. In the event, however, the episodes which saw Casualty's Charlie Fairhead (Derek Thompson) operated on by Holby City's Elliot Hope (Paul Bradley) after suffering a heart attack were broadcast as regular Casualty and Holby City episodes, rather than under the Casualty@Holby City title.

Since then, characters periodically crossover typically for a single episode at a time to fit an ongoing storyline. This has proved popular among fans and is logistically more practical than previous crossover events. In more recent years, characters have attained different positions within the hospital which sees them crossover permanently. Connie Beauchamp began appearing permanently in Casualty in March 2014 following her departure from Holby City in December 2010. Fletch departed Casualty in June 2014 before appearing permanently on Holby City from August the same year. Lee Mead portrayed Lofty on Casualty from March 2014 to March 2016. Following his departure, it was announced Mead would be reprising his role in Holby City from April 2017.

Another smaller scale crossover event was broadcast in August 2016, in "Too Old for This Shift" and "Protect and Serve" The episodes were co-written by Matthew Barry and Andy Bayliss (Casualty) and Steve Brett and Joe Ainsworth (Holby City). The episodes follow on from the cliffhanger at the end of the thirtieth series, by focusing on the events surrounding the aftermath of an accident involving Connie Beauchamp (Amanda Mealing) and her daughter Grace (Emily Carey), including a helicopter crash outside Holby City Hospital's emergency department, during celebrations of Charlie Fairhead's (Derek Thompson) thirtieth year working at the hospital.

Another series of crossovers was implemented in late 2017, with a number of characters that swapped over for episodes.

Another crossover happened in 2019 called CasualtyXHolby this centred around Holby City Hospital experience a loss of power due to a cyberattack. Consultants Connie Beauchamp (Amanda Mealing) and Jac Naylor (Rosie Marcel) also come into conflict when they learn there is only one theatre available while treating two of their colleagues.
