= Simon MacCorkindale =

British actor (1952–2010)

- MacCorkindale in 2008
- Born: Simon Charles Pendered MacCorkindale; 12 February 1952; Ely, Cambridgeshire, England
- Died: 14 October 2010 (aged 58); London, England
- Occupations: Actor; director; producer; writer
- Years active: 1973–2010
- Spouses: Fiona Fullerton (m. 1976; div. 1982); Susan George (m. 1984)

Simon Charles Pendered MacCorkindale (12 February 1952 – 14 October 2010) was a British actor, film director, writer, and producer from Ely, England. He spent much of his childhood moving around owing to his father's career as an officer with the Royal Air Force (RAF). Poor eyesight prevented him from following a similar career in the RAF, so he instead planned to become a theatre director. Training at Studio 68 of Theatre Arts in London, he started work as an actor, making his West End debut in 1974. He went on to appear in numerous roles in television, including the series I, Claudius and Jesus of Nazareth, before starring as Simon Doyle in the film Death on the Nile (1978). This proved to be a breakthrough role. He appeared in a variety of films and TV series including Quatermass (1979), The Riddle of the Sands (1979), The Sword and the Sorcerer (1982) and Jaws 3-D (1983).

In 1983, MacCorkindale starred in the short-lived series Manimal as the lead character, Dr. Jonathan Chase, reprising the role in Night Man, before taking up the longer-running role of lawyer Greg Reardon in Falcon Crest. Throughout the late 1980s and 1990s he directed and produced many stage, TV and film productions through his company Amy International Artists, such as the film Stealing Heaven (1988). Moving to Canada, he starred as Peter Sinclair in the series Counterstrike for three years. He returned to the United Kingdom in 2002 and joined the cast of the BBC medical drama Casualty, appearing in the role of Harry Harper for six years until 2008.

== Early life ==
MacCorkindale was born on 12 February 1952 in Ely to Scottish parents Gilliver Mary (née Pendered) and Peter Bernard MacCorkindale OBE, who died in September 2007. Simon had a brother, Duncan.

Their father was an RAF Group Captain station commander. MacCorkindale spent some of his childhood in Edinburgh, where his father was stationed for a period, although Peter MacCorkindale's changing postings necessitated 17 moves to places across Europe. He attended Haileybury and Imperial Service College from 1965 to 1970, where he was Head Boy and a member of the Air Training Corps. Originally intending to enlist in the RAF, he abandoned this plan at the age of 13 when his eyesight began to deteriorate. MacCorkindale considered joining the diplomatic corps to become an ambassador, but instead opted to become a stage director after developing an interest in theatre.

MacCorkindale had been a fan of theatre since writing a play at the age of eight, joking that it was "unproduceable" because "it required an enormous cast and a considerable amount of rum drinking." Making his acting debut at the same age, he went on to appear on stage and work behind the scenes of numerous school and theatre group productions throughout his childhood.

Persuading his parents that he would find a "sensible job" if a career as a director was not sustaining him financially by the age of 25, MacCorkindale decided not to study at university and instead attended the Studio 68 drama school at the Theatre of Arts in London. MacCorkindale opted to continue acting after graduating from the Theatre of Arts; he decided to amass more experience in the role to have better confidence as a director.

== Acting career ==
=== Early work (1973–1979) ===
MacCorkindale started his acting career in theatre, touring the United Kingdom with a repertory theatre group. His first professional stage performance was in a 1973 run of A Bequest to the Nation at the Belgrade Theatre in Coventry. He made his West End theatre debut in a production of Pygmalion in 1974, appearing alongside Alec McCowen and Diana Rigg in the role of "Sarcastic Bystander". In 1973, the series Hawkeye, The Pathfinder had given MacCorkindale his first TV credit. He went on to appear in a number of other TV series, including Within These Walls, Sutherland's Law, I, Claudius (as Lucius Caesar) and Jesus of Nazareth.

MacCorkindale's film debut came in 1974 with Juggernaut. He was cast as Simon Doyle in the 1978 film adaptation of Agatha Christie's Death on the Nile at the age of 25. The role boosted MacCorkindale's public profile and he considered it to be his career break. He won the London Evening Standard Film Award for Most Promising Newcomer for this part. MacCorkindale went on to star as sailor and spy Arthur Davies in The Riddle of the Sands (1979), the film adaptation of the celebrated Erskine Childers' novel.

MacCorkindale played astronomer Joe Kapp in Nigel Kneale's TV serial Quatermass (1979), starring alongside John Mills. He had previously starred in an episode of Kneale's series Beasts and enjoyed appearing in the role of Kapp, finding it a change from the typecast romantic roles that he had become accustomed to playing, while noting that it was "challenging" conveying the character's strong Jewish faith. Kneale later expressed disappointment with MacCorkindale's performance, commenting, "We had him in Beasts playing an idiot and he was very good at that".

=== Manimal, Falcon Crest and film roles (1980–1986) ===
Following the success of Death on the Nile, MacCorkindale moved to the United States in 1980. Although warned that it would limit his chance of finding work, MacCorkindale refused to adopt an American accent when auditioning, believing that his British diction would help fill a "niche". However, for two years he failed at the audition stage for all major parts on account of his nationality. The American Broadcasting Company (ABC) told MacCorkindale that he was not an "eight o'clock actor", which he took to mean that "at that time of night they didn't want viewers watching someone who sounded intellectual or who had an accent that was alien to their ears and, therefore, hard work when it came to listening." During this time he appeared in single-episode roles in series such as Dynasty, Fantasy Island, Hart to Hart, Matt Houston and The Dukes of Hazzard, as well as playing David Clement, an aristocrat, in the mini-series Manions of America.

He was eventually cast in the adventure series Manimal for NBC in 1983, in which he played the lead character Professor Jonathan Chase, an Englishman who assists police in the fight against crime with his ability to transform into animals. The role impressed MacCorkindale, who considered Chase to be a "very cerebral individual". Filming on Manimal would often run for as long as 14 to 16 hours per day, and MacCorkindale would sometimes be required to work at weekends to be made up with the prosthetics necessary for Manimal's transformation sequences. The low ratings that resulted in the cancellation of Manimal after one season of eight episodes was in part due to NBC broadcasting the series at the same time as Dallas on CBS, Manimal losing out to the more popular "soap". Budget cuts also contributed to the series' cancellation as it was the network's most expensive series. Manimal has since acquired a global cult following.

In 1984, he was cast as lawyer Greg Reardon in the soap opera Falcon Crest. MacCorkindale asked for the character, originally an American named Brad, to be rewritten as British, and also directed one episode. He appeared in two full seasons (59 episodes) of the show until 1986. McCorkindale claimed that he "felt that the work I was doing was fun and lucrative but not as stretching as I felt I wanted or needed. I also was finding fault with much of the work, not only Falcon Crest, but everything. I was actually ready to quit acting and try producing so I could put myself on the line."

MacCorkindale appeared in the films Caboblanco (1980) and The Sword and the Sorcerer (1982, as Prince Mikah), and starred as Philip FitzRoyce in the poorly received third part of the Jaws film series, Jaws 3-D (1983). In the mid-1980s, MacCorkindale was considered for the role of James Bond as a possible successor to Roger Moore, but was not cast. Jaws 3-D proved to be his last major film role.

=== Counterstrike and other Canadian projects (1990–2000) ===
In the 1990s, MacCorkindale returned to acting after a hiatus in which he had focused on production work. He appeared in a number of projects in Canada, which he felt "could be at the crossroads of international production." From 1990 to 1993, MacCorkindale played former Scotland Yard inspector Peter Sinclair in the Toronto-filmed USA Network series Counterstrike, alongside Christopher Plummer. He was offered the part by producer Robert Lantos, who wanted to work with MacCorkindale while for his part the actor wished to return to acting after three years running Amy International. With production complete on several episodes, feeling that the show was "too plot-driven rather than character-driven", MacCorkindale thereafter became a writer for the series. He was appointed an executive production consultant that ensured that he "could make quicker [on-set] judgments on behalf of the production."

Following Counterstrike, MacCorkindale appeared in the final episode of the TV drama E.N.G., whereafter his "media tycoon" character was planned to be the star of a spin-off alongside actress Sara Botsford, but the project was abandoned. He starred in numerous TV films throughout the 1990s, including a part as the villain in The Girl Next Door. MacCorkindale was glad to "gradually [switch] to villains" as "that's more fun than [playing] the straitlaced hero." MacCorkindale also reprised the role of Dr Chase from Manimal in an episode of Night Man in 1998, which incorporated computer-generated imagery for the transformations as opposed to prosthetic makeup, and also directed an episode of the series. Other appearances included the TV series Earth: Final Conflict, La Femme Nikita and the 2000 TV film The Dinosaur Hunter.

=== Casualty and final roles (2002–2010) ===
MacCorkindale returned to the UK in 2002 and joined the cast of the BBC One medical drama Casualty, in the role of clinical lead consultant Harry Harper. Following his casting, he said in an interview with the Daily Record that he was a long-time fan of the series, commenting that it was "great to be joining an established show with a great bunch of people." In contrast, Neil Bonner of the Liverpool Daily Post quoted him as stating that he had never seen an episode of the show in its then-16-year history. MacCorkindale was surprised to be offered the role of Harper given the many years that he had spent working in North America, but having settled in Exmoor found Bristol to be an accessible production base. MacCorkindale was "never too comfortable as a young actor" and "always felt that [his] best time in the business would be around [the age of 50]." MacCorkindale commented that he "loved [his] time on Casualty," and spent time researching all the medical terminology that his character used to ensure that he understood it. He also appeared as Harper in the Casualty spin-off series Holby City and Casualty@Holby City. Many reviewers were disparaging of MacCorkindale's performances in Casualty: Rupert Smith of The Guardian deemed MacCorkindale "fantastically wooden", while fellow Guardian journalists Sarah Dempster and Jim Shelley commented on MacCorkindale's "loud" delivery of his lines. Shelley described the character of Harper as a "human Foghorn Leghorn", while according to Dempster, Casualty was "above all [...] about Simon MacCorkindale, shouting. Then panting, alarmingly, as he peers through some blinds. And then shouting again."

In January 2007, MacCorkindale was given a five-month sabbatical from Casualty because a plotline required that his character be temporarily removed from the series. He took the opportunity to tour the United Kingdom in a revival of the Agatha Christie murder mystery play The Unexpected Guest. He then returned to Casualty, but having re-discovered his taste for theatre, left the series permanently in 2008 to appear as Andrew Wyke in a UK tour of Anthony Shaffer's Sleuth. By the time that MacCorkindale quit Casualty, he had appeared in 229 episodes of the series.

In August 2008, he replaced Simon Burke as Captain Georg Ludwig von Trapp in the London Palladium production of The Sound of Music, remaining with the show until its closure in February 2009. After small parts in the films 13 Hrs and A Closed Book, he returned to TV as Sir David Bryant in the 2010 series of New Tricks, in what proved to be his final TV appearance.

== Production work ==
MacCorkindale produced, directed and wrote a number of film, television and theatre productions throughout his career. In the 1980s, he directed three performances of the play Sleuth, starring Douglas Fairbanks Jr., Howard Keel and James Whitmore, and a Los Angeles production of The Merchant of Venice, and starred in the one-man show The Importance of Being Oscar at the Globe Playhouse in 1981.

After his departure from Falcon Crest, MacCorkindale returned to the United Kingdom in 1986 to form a production company. The following year, he established Amy International Artists, based at Shepperton Studios, with his wife Susan George, and also Apollo Films International. He subsequently directed, wrote and produced a number of projects for Amy International, including the film Stealing Heaven (1988) (concerning the medieval French philosopher Abelard and his passion for Heloise), and the film Djavolji Raj (1989) (That Summer of White Roses), which stars George and features romantic theme music composed by MacCorkindale. MacCorkindale and George purchased the rights to each project because they wished to "make the pictures that we just totally and literally believe in", regardless of their commercial success.

Working in partnership with Chris Bryant, MacCorkindale wrote and directed the television film The House That Mary Bought (1995), and with Paul Stephens co-produced the film Such a Long Journey (1998), for which he was nominated for the Genie Award for Best Motion Picture. MacCorkindale then wrote the screenplay for a biographical film of the missing peer Lord Lucan, which he also planned to produce and act in, although financial problems resulted in the cancellation of the project in 1996. He served as co-executive producer for the 2000 syndicated TV series Queen of Swords, and as co-producer for the 2002 series Adventure Inc.. MacCorkindale also co-produced the third season of Relic Hunter in 2002.

== Personal life ==
MacCorkindale was married twice. His first wife was actress Fiona Fullerton; the couple married in 1976 and divorced in 1982. Following his divorce from Fullerton, MacCorkindale began a relationship with actress Susan George, whom he had first met in 1977; they married secretly in Fiji on 5 October 1984 and later held a second ceremony with family and friends in Berkshire, England. With George, MacCorkindale managed an Arabian stud farm based in Exmoor.

== Death ==
Simon MacCorkindale was diagnosed with bowel cancer in 2006. He underwent surgery to remove part of his bowel during a two-week break from filming Casualty. The initial surgery was successful, and the cancer entered remission. However, a year later, it was found to have metastasised to his lungs.

Despite his illness, MacCorkindale continued to work, returning to film his final series of Casualty in late 2007. He did not disclose his condition to his colleagues, often finding it surreal when his character had to inform patients about cancer or other incurable diseases. He invested significantly in private cancer treatments in the United States, though these efforts met with limited success.

In November 2009, MacCorkindale publicly announced that his cancer was terminal. He died on 14 October 2010 aged 58.

== Filmography ==
=== Film ===
| Year | Title | Role | Notes |
|---|---|---|---|
| 1974 | Juggernaut | No. 1 Helmsman | |
| 1978 | Death on the Nile | Simon Doyle | |
| 1979 | The Riddle of the Sands | Arthur Davies | |
| 1980 | Caboblanco | Lewis Clarkson | |
| 1981 | Macbeth | Macduff | |
| 1982 | The Sword and the Sorcerer | Prince Mikah | |
| 1982 | An Outpost of Progress | Kayerts | |
| 1983 | Jaws 3-D | Philip FitzRoyce | |
| 1987 | Shades of Love: Sincerely, Violet | Mark Jamieson | Direct-to-video release |
| 1988 | Stealing Heaven | N/A | Producer |
| 1989 | That Summer of White Roses | N/A | Producer, composer and writer |
| 1998 | Such A Long Journey | N/A | Producer |
| 1999 | Wing Commander | Flight Boss | |
| 2010 | A Closed Book | Andrew Boles | |
| 2010 | 13Hrs | Duncan Moore | |

=== Television ===
| Year | Title | Role | Notes |
|---|---|---|---|
| 1973 | Hawkeye, the Pathfinder | Lieutenant Carter | Appeared in three episodes |
| 1974 | Play of the Month | Rolf | Episode 9.8: "The Skin Game" |
| 1975 | Sutherland's Law | Ian Sutherland | Episode 4.5: "No Second Chance" |
| 1976 | Romeo and Juliet | Paris | TV film |
| 1976 | Hunter's Walk | Houseman | Episode 3.1: "Intent" |
| 1976 | I, Claudius | Lucius | Episode 1.2: "Waiting in the Wings" |
| 1976 | Beasts | Peter Gilkes | Episode 1.4: "Baby" |
| 1976–1978 | Within These Walls | Dr Dady | Appeared in three episodes |
| 1977 | Romance | Paul Verdayne | Episode 1.2: "Three Weeks" |
| 1977 | Jesus of Nazareth | Lucius | TV miniseries |
| 1977 | Just William | Charlie | Episode 1.12: "William and the Sleeping Major" |
| 1978 | The Doombolt Chase | Lt. Cmdr. Madock | Episode 1.1: "Court of Shame" |
| 1978 | Will Shakespeare | Sir Thomas Walsingham | Episode 1.1: "Dead Shepherd" |
| 1979 | Quatermass | Joe Kapp | TV serial; appeared in all four episodes |
| 1979 | The Dukes of Hazzard | Gaylord Duke (Roger Blevin) | 2.13: "Duke of Duke" |
| 1980 | Hammer House of Horror | Harry Wells | Episode 1.11: "Visitor from the Grave" |
| 1981 | Manions of America | David Clement | TV miniseries |
| 1981 | Fantasy Island | Gaston du Brielle | Episode 5.3: "Cyrano/The Magician" |
| 1982 | Hart to Hart | Arthur Roman | Episode 4.3: "Million Dollar Harts" |
| 1982 | Dynasty | Billy Dawson | Episode 3.4: "The Will" |
| 1982 | Falcon's Gold | Hank Richards | TV film |
| 1983 | Manimal | Jonathan Chase | Appeared in all eight episodes |
| 1984 | Obsessive Love | Glenn Stevens | TV film |
| 1984 | Matt Houston | Robert Tyler | Episode 3.3: "Eyewitness" |
| 1984–1986 | Falcon Crest | Greg Reardon | Appeared in 59 episodes |
| 1989 | Pursuit | Manley-Jones | TV film |
| 1990–1993 | Counterstrike | Peter Sinclair | Appeared in 65 episodes |
| 1994 | E.N.G. | Maxwell Harding | Episode 5.14: "Cutting Edge" |
| 1995 | The Way to Dusty Death | Johnny Harlow | TV film |
| 1995 | At the Midnight Hour | Richard Keaton | TV film |
| 1995 | Family of Cops | Adam Novacek | TV film |
| 1995 | The House That Mary Bought | N/A | Director and writer |
| 1996 | No Greater Love | Patrick Kelly | TV film |
| 1997 | While My Pretty One Sleeps | Jack Campbell | TV film |
| 1997 | La Femme Nikita | Alec Chandler | Episode 1.4: "Charity" |
| 1998 | La Guerre de l'eau | Peter Gregory | TV film |
| 1998 | Running Wild | Walton Baden Smythe | TV film |
| 1998 | Night Man | Jonathan Chase | Episode 2.6: "Manimal" |
| 1999 | The Girl Next Door | Steve Vandermeer | TV film |
| 1999 | Poltergeist: The Legacy | Reed Horton | Appeared in five episodes |
| 1999 | Mentors | Oscar Wilde | Episode 1.6: "Wilde Card" |
| 2000 | Earth: Final Conflict | Dennis Robillard | Episode 3.14: "Scorched Earth" |
| 2000 | The Dinosaur Hunter | Jack | TV film |
| 2001 | Dark Realm | Brad Collins | Appeared in two episodes |
| 2001 | Queen of Swords | Captain Charles Wentworth | Episode 1.15: "Runaways"; also series co-executive producer |
| 2001–2002 | Relic Hunter | Fabrice De Viega | Appeared in three episodes and co-executive producer in the third series. |
| 2002–2003 | Adventure Inc. | N/A | Co-producer |
| 2002–2008 | Casualty | Dr. Harry Harper | Appeared in 229 episodes |
| 2004–2005 | Holby City | Harry Harper | Appeared in two episodes |
| 2005 | Casualty@Holby City | Harry Harper | Appeared in three specials |
| 2010 | New Tricks | Sir David Bryant | Episode 7.5: "Good Morning Lemmings", (final appearance) |
