= Harry Harper (Casualty) =

Fictional character from the BBC medical drama Casualty

- Casualty character
- Portrayed by: Simon MacCorkindale
- Duration: 2002–2008
- First appearance: 8 June 2002
- Last appearance: 8 March 2008
- Introduced by: Mervyn Watson
- Spin-off appearances: Casualty@Holby City (2004, 2005)
In-universe information
- Occupation: Director of Emergency Medicine & Senior Consultant (2002-2007-2008); Member of Parliament (2007)
- Wife: Beth Harper (until 2003)
- Sons: Jordan Harper; Ollie Harper
- Daughters: Tally Harper; Kizzy Harper; Daisy Harper

Harry Harper is a fictional character from the BBC One medical drama Casualty, portrayed by actor Simon MacCorkindale. He made his first appearance in the series sixteen episode "Denial", broadcast on 8 June 2002. He ran Holby City Hospital's emergency department for five years, before being elected as a Member of Parliament. His final appearance was in the series twenty-two episode "Thicker Than Water", broadcast on 8 March 2008. MacCorkindale was diagnosed with bowel cancer in 2006, and departed from Casualty after the disease spread to his lungs. He died on 14 October 2010, at the age of 58.

== Storylines ==
Harry begins working at Holby City Hospital in June 2002. He is pleased when his old flame Selena Donovan (Liz Carling) arrives to carry out a drugs trial in the department, and invites her to dinner. He cancels a driving lesson with his teenage daughter Tally (Ashlie Walker), who asks her mother Beth (Lynda Rooke) to take her instead. They crash, and Beth is fatally injured. Harry blames Tally for the accident and develops an anti-depressant dependency, forging senior house officer Lara Stone's (Christine Stephen-Daly) signature to prescribe himself drugs.

Harry clashes with registrar Simon Kaminski (Christopher Colquhoun) over his temperament, suspending him from work. In revenge, Simon begins sleeping with Tally (Holly Davidson). He learns that Harry has been self-prescribing and attempts to blackmail him. Lara notices the strained atmosphere between them, and Harry confides in her that he needs help, accepting her support. He misinterprets Lara's kindness, however, and tells her he is in love with her. His feelings go un-reciprocated, and Harry is angry when Lara sleeps with paramedic Luke Warren. On an outdoor pursuit day for management training, Harry leaves the marked route and becomes trapped in a cave. Simon rescues him, incurring a spinal injury in the process.

Several weeks later, Harry discovers that Lara has begun a relationship with Simon. Tally takes the news badly and behaves erratically, leaving Harry no choice but to suspend her on the anniversary of Beth's death. When Simon mocks her, Tally attempts suicide by taking an overdose. She recovers, but Harry realises he has been neglecting her and takes her on holiday. Lara and Simon become engaged, but Harry discovers he has been cheating on her, taking Lara away from the venue on her wedding day. Simon dies in a plane crash en route to the wedding, and Lara disappoints Harry by moving to Australia.

Selena returns to the department in 2004, having married since her last meeting with Harry. When she is stabbed in the hospital car park, Harry realises he still has feelings for her, but Selena cuts him off as he tries to tell her. Harry begins a relationship with nurse Ellen Zitek (Georgina Bouzova), who becomes pregnant. Harry proposes, believing it is the right thing to do, but Ellen turns him down. It transpires that Ellen had a cancerous molar pregnancy. She is later hit by a motorbike and dies, leaving Harry distraught. He decides to go into politics when the department is threatened with closure, winning the local by-election. Following his last shift at the hospital, Harry and Selena sleep together. Jealous corporate director Nathan Spencer (Ben Price) deletes text messages Harry sends to Selena, leading her to believe their night together was a mistake.

After several months in Westminster, Harry returns to the department having arranged for the Secretary of State for Health to visit. Harry and Selena are held at gunpoint by a patient's wife, and Selena declares her love for Harry before taking a bullet for him and dying. Following a bomb scare in the hospital, junior doctor Guppy convinces Harry to return, taking a job as consultant manager. When F2 doctor Ruth Winters (Georgia Taylor) attempts suicide, Harry makes her diary—reflecting how the NHS has failed her—public, and is forced to resign.

== Development ==
MacCorkindale joined the cast of Casualty in February 2002. Following his casting, he told the Daily Record that he was a long-standing fan of the series, commenting that it was "great to be joining an established show with a great bunch of people." Neil Bonner of the Liverpool Daily Post conflictingly quoted MacCorkindale as stating that he had never seen an episode of the show in its sixteen-year history. He was surprised to be offered the role of Harry, having spent years beforehand working in the United States, but found its Bristol location ideal having recently moved to the West Country.

Compiling a "medical dream team" from multiple television hospital dramas, The Guardian's Grace Dent assessed Harry's characterization as being "Alpha male", writing that he "comes from a long line of TV medics who stride through the hospital wards like demi-gods, saving lives, sorting out lesser medics' muck-ups and, more importantly, wooing the knickers off any passing nurse." Dent deemed Harry unflappable professionally and a gentleman in his personal life, with old-fashioned principles with regards to women.

In 2006, MacCorkindale experienced stomach cramps whilst filming Casualty and was diagnosed with bowel cancer. He had a section of his colon removed, and despite recommendation from doctors that he allow ten to twelve weeks for recovery, MacCorkindale scheduled the operation to coincide with a two-week break in Casualty's filming schedule. He took a sixth-month sabbatical from the show, during which time he toured with a theatrical production of Agatha Christie's The Unexpected Guest. In May 2007, MacCorkindale learned that the cancer had spread to his lungs, and was told he had five years to live. He returned to film his final series of Casualty in late 2007. He did not disclose his illness to his colleagues, and found it surreal when scripts required Harry to inform patients that they had cancer or an incurable disease. MacCorkindale departed from Casualty at the end of 2007, having appeared in 229 episodes. He died on 14 October 2010, aged 58. John Yorke, Controller of BBC Drama, praised the actor, stating: "As the star and male lead of Casualty for over six years we owe Simon a massive debt. Not only was he a fabulously iconic consultant, he was also an inspirational team leader. One of the reasons so many people have loved working with him on Casualty is because of the tone he established on the shop floor—always welcoming, always disciplined, always quietly the leader."

== Reception ==
Reviewing the 2002 episode in which Harry attends to a fairground disaster, The Guardian's Rupert Smith deemed MacCorkindale "fantastically wooden". He described the plot as "ridiculous", highlighting the convenience of Harry happening to be present when the incident occurred. The following year, Smith again highlighted credibility issues with a plot which revealed Harry to be a friend of photographer Patrick Lichfield, writing that the revelation was "one of the most throwaway bits of exposition ever seen in British television drama." Fellow Guardian critics Sarah Dempster and Jim Shelley have both commented on MacCorkindale's "loud" delivery of his lines, with Shelley deeming Harry a "human Foghorn Leghorn", and Dempster describing Casualty as being "Above all [...] about Simon MacCorkindale, shouting. Then panting, alarmingly, as he peers through some blinds. And then shouting again."
