= Caboblanco =

1980 film by J. Lee Thompson

- Theatrical release poster
- Directed by: J. Lee Thompson
- Written by: Morton S. Fine; Milton S. Gelman
- Produced by: Lance Hool
- Starring: Charles Bronson; Jason Robards; Dominique Sanda; Fernando Rey; Simon MacCorkindale; Camilla Sparv; Gilbert Roland
- Cinematography: Alex Phillips Jr.
- Music by: Jerry Goldsmith
- Production companies: Arco Films; Cabo Blanco Production Inc. MVS Televisión
- Distributed by: Avco Embassy Pictures
- Release dates: 1980 (U.S.); 1981 (UK)
- Running time: 91 minutes
- Country: United States
- Language: English
- Budget: $10 million

Caboblanco is a 1980 American drama film directed by J. Lee Thompson, starring Charles Bronson, Dominique Sanda and Jason Robards. The film has often been described as a remake of Casablanca.

The movie marks the third collaboration between Bronson and director J. Lee Thompson (following 1976's St. Ives and 1977's The White Buffalo).

== Plot ==
Giff Hoyt (Bronson), a cafe owner in Cabo Blanco, Peru after World War II is caught between refuge-seeking Nazis and their enemies. After the murder of a sea explorer is passed off as accidental death by the corrupt local police, Giff becomes suspicious. The police chief (Rey) also intimidates a new arrival Marie (Sanda), and Giff intervenes to help her. Giff suspects Beckdorff (Robards), a Nazi refugee living in the area. Beckdorff, it emerges, is seeking to uncover sunken treasure.

== Cast ==
- Charles Bronson as Gifford "Giff" Hoyt
- Jason Robards as Gunther Beckdorff
- Dominique Sanda as Marie Claire Allesandri
- Fernando Rey as Captain Terredo
- Simon MacCorkindale as Lewis Clarkson
- Camilla Sparv as Hera
- Gilbert Roland as Ramirez
- Denny Miller as Horst
- James Booth as John Baker
- Clifton James as Lorrimer

== Production ==
Bronson said, "I was drawn to it because it didn't have too much violence in it. The script read and smelled like the kind of thing I enjoyed as a kid, something far away from the mines."

According to co-producer Lance Hool, there was a two-hour version of the film released in 1979 to Italy, France, Sweden, Portugal, Greece, Argentina, and Venezuela that contained additional chase and action scenes. After being turned down for distribution by all the major studios, director Thompson then supervised cuts for a 96- and 87-minute version. Clifton James' role as an American tourist was completely excised, although his name still appears on the credits.

== Reception ==
The film was poorly received by critics, described as an "appalling rehash" of Casablanca and as "indescribably inept" by Time Out. Halliwell's Film Guide described it as a "witless spoof of Casablanca which seems to have been cobbled together from a half-finished negative."

Jerry Vermilye states that the movie's producers advised the trade press that it was not a remake of Casablanca, arguing that the similarities were very limited.
