= Burdis =

Burdis is a surname. Notable people with the surname include

- Ray Burdis (born 1959), English actor, screenwriter, director, and film producer
- Mark Burdis (born 1968), English actor

== See also ==
- Burdi (disambiguation)
