= Perry Benson =

English actor

- Born: 9 April 1961 (age 65); London, England
- Occupation: Actor
- Height: 1.65 m (5 ft 5 in)

Perry Benson (born 9 April 1961) is a British character actor, having had regular roles in British television sitcoms You Rang, M'Lord? (1988–1993), Oh, Doctor Beeching! (1995–1997) and Operation Good Guys (1997–2000). Other credits include Scum (1979), Love, Honour and Obey (2000), Alien Autopsy (2006), This Is England (2006), Mum & Dad (2008), Vinyl (2012), Get Santa (2014), Benidorm (2014-2015), Accident Man (2018), and Accident Man: Hitman's Holiday (2022). Benson is the brother of the actress Kim Benson.

== Film career ==
Benson has appeared in the British films Quadrophenia (1979), Scum (1979), Love, Honour and Obey (2000), Alien Autopsy (2006), This Is England (2006), Somers Town (2008), and Mum & Dad (2008). He had a lead role in Stars of the Roller State Disco, a 1984 made-for-TV play by Alan Clarke.

Benson also appeared as Sex Pistols drummer Paul Cook in the 1986 biopic Sid And Nancy. In 1987, he played Trevor in the Hi-de-Hi! episode "Tell It to the Marines".

Benson appears as a policeman in the video for Goldie Looking Chain's single "Guns Don't Kill People Rappers Do". Benson also appeared alongside Pauline Quirke, Robert Lindsay and Daniela Denby-Ashe, as a bank robber in the 2008 episode "Let's Not Be Heisty" of the BBC sitcom My Family. He is best known for his regular roles in British television sitcoms You Rang, M'Lord? (1988–1993), Oh, Doctor Beeching! (1995–1997) and Operation Good Guys (1997–2000).

Benson appeared alongside Jimmy Nail in the BBC TV show Parents of the Band, written by Dick Clement and Ian La Frenais. He also starred in the vampire film Dead Cert, directed by Steven Lawson.

In 2012 (released 2013 in the UK), he played an ageing rock star alongside Phil Daniels and Keith Allen in Sara Sugarman's film Vinyl.

In 2014, he starred as Clive Dyke in the ITV sitcom Benidorm, alongside Hannah Waddingham who played his wife Tonya. He left the show in 2015, after appearing in 14 episodes.

== Television roles ==
Year	Title	Role
1978	Grange Hill	Boy on Stairs
1980	Going Out	Sammy Lee
1983	Blackadder	Pigeon Vendor
1984	Dream Stuffing	Keith
1984	The Young Ones	Spaz
1987	Filthy, Rich and Catflap	Freddy Gorgeous
1987	Hi-de-Hi! (episode titled "Tell It to the Marines")	Trevor
1988–1993	You Rang, M'Lord?	Henry Livingstone
1989	The Bill	Harry Thompson
1991–1992	The Real McCoy	Various roles
1995–1997	Oh, Doctor Beeching!	Ralph
1997–2000	Operation Good Guys	Bones
1999	15 Storeys High	Man with a horse in his flat
2000	15 Storeys High	Ping Pong obsessed twin
2001	Starstreet	Mr Benson
2004	Top Buzzer	Boring Dave
2008	My Family	Gary
2009	Misfits	Beverly Morgan
2009	Casualty	Robbie
2010	Doctor Who "The Eleventh Hour"	Ice Cream Man
2010	This is England '86	Meggy
2010	Excluded (BBC Drama)	Steve Heston
2013	Man Down	Mr. Harringey
2014–2015	Benidorm	Clive Dyke
2015	This Is England '90	Meggy
2016	Holby City	Danny Morrison
2016	Morgana Robinson's The Agency	Nat's Dad
2018	Lee and Dean	Terry
2018	Sick of It	Delivery Man
2019	Don't Forget the Driver	Nigel
2023	Casualty	Garry Towlen

== Filmography ==
Year	Title	Role	Notes
1974	Where's Johnny?	Maurice	
1974	What Next?	Ted	
1978	The Class of Miss MacMichael	Timmy	
1979	Scum	Formby	
1979	Quadrophenia	Eric	
1982	The Island of Adventure	Jack Trent	
1986	Sid And Nancy	Paul	
1995	Annie: A Royal Adventure!	Mean Murphy Knuckles	
1998	Final Cut	Tony	
1999	The Last Seduction II	Samuel Burgess	
2000	Love, Honour and Obey	Perry 'Fat Alan'	
2001	Last Resort	Immigration Officer	
2001	Mr In-Between	Nelson	
2001	Redemption Road	Barman	
2003	Cheeky	George	
2003	Capital Punishment	Steve	
2006	Alien Autopsy	Trading Standards Officer	
2006	This is England	Meggy	
2008	Somers Town	Graham Cutler	
2008	Mum & Dad	Dad	
2010	Dead Cert	Magoo	
2011	Outside Bet	Sefton Wallace	
2011	Anuvahood	Brian	
2012	I, Anna	Morris	
2012	Vinyl	Robbie	
2012	Borrowed Time	Ted	
2014	Get Santa	Jimbo	
2018	Suggs: My Life Story	Taxi Driver	
2018	Accident Man	Finicky Fred	
2019	Break Clause	Danny	
2020	To Be Someone	Ken	
2021	Creation Stories	Mickey	
2021	Me, Myself and Di	Martin	
2021	The Last Heist	Mick	
2022	Accident Man: Hitman's Holiday	Finicky Fred	
2024	A Gangster's Kiss	Marmite	
2024	Members Club	Neil	
2026	Jackie the Stripper	Levi	
