= Casualty series 18 =

Eighteenth series of Casualty

Casualty
- Series 18
- Starring: Ian Bleasdale; Louise Brealey; Maxwell Caulfield; Christopher Colquhoun; Holly Davidson; Rebekah Gibbs; Kelly Harrison; Kwame Kwei-Armah; Martina Laird; Simon MacCorkindale; Sarah Manners; Suzanne Packer; James Redmond; Zita Sattar; Christine Stephen-Daly; Derek Thompson; Matthew Wait; Leanne Wilson
- No. of episodes: 46

Release
- Original network: BBC One
- Original release: 13 September 2003 – 28 August 2004

Series chronology
- ← Previous; Series 17 Next → Series 19

The eighteenth series of the British medical drama television series Casualty began airing on BBC One in the United Kingdom on 13 September 2003, and concluded on 28 August 2004. The series consists of 46 episodes, which focus on the professional and personal lives of medical and ancillary staff at the emergency department (ED) of the fictional Holby City Hospital.

Series 18 of Casualty marks the show becoming the longest running television medical drama series in the world. The serial was nominated for Best Continuing Drama at the 2004 British Academy Television Awards during the series. In a 2011 poll run by the show's website, to celebrate its twenty-fifth anniversary, the opening episode of the series was voted the best ever episode.

== Production ==
The series commenced in the United Kingdom on 13 September 2003 on BBC One with a two-part episode airing over consecutive days. Foz Allan serves as the series producer, while Mal Young and Mervyn Watson act as the executive producers of the series. Young, who is also the BBC Controller of Drama, commented, "Series 18 will hopefully keep surprising and gripping our audience." The series films in Bristol and marks Casualty becoming the longest running television medical drama series in the world. The opening episodes, billed as the show's "most ambitious yet", feature a double train crash. The stunt took two production teams working to film over 24 days and featured 1470 supporting artists. The episode were filmed on-location in the Nene Valley Railway in Peterborough. Actors Kwame Kwei-Armah and Ian Bleasdale, who portray paramedics Finlay Newton and Josh Griffiths respectively, enjoyed filming the stunt. Kwei-Armah compared it to the making of a "big movie". Writers created a story to raise money for the 24th Children in Need telethon, in November 2003. Featuring a cameo appearance from Lord Lichfield, the story sees staff create a charity calendar, which was later sold commercially to raise money for Children in Need.

== Cast ==
The eighteenth series of Casualty features a cast of characters working for the NHS within the emergency department of Holby City Hospital and the Holby Ambulance Service. Twelve cast members from the previous series reprise their roles in this series. Original cast member Derek Thompson continues his role as Charlie Fairhead, a clinical nurse specialist. Having joined in the fourth series, Ian Bleasdale stars as Josh Griffiths, the operational duty manager at Holby Ambulance Service. Simon MacCorkindale plays Harry Harper, a consultant in emergency medicine and the department's clinical director. Christine Stephen-Daly portrays Lara Stone, an acting registrar, and Christopher Colquhoun appears as registrar Simon Kaminski. Louise Brealey and Zita Sattar feature as Roxy Bird and Anna Paul, both staff nurses. Kwame Kwei-Armah, Martina Laird and Matthew Wait play paramedics Finlay Newton, Comfort Jones and Luke Warren, respectively. Kelly Harrison portrays Nikki Marshall, an ambulance technician, and Sarah Manners appears as Bex Reynolds, a receptionist.

Actress Suzanne Packer joined the cast in episode one as Tess Bateman, an emergency nurse practitioner. She is billed as "a traditionalist [who] is keen to maintain the standards she was taught at nursing college". The character and Packer's casting details were announced on 24 April 2003. Tess's introduction reflected the rise in nurse practitioners being hired in NHS hospitals. For the role, Packer relocated from New York City to Cardiff, where her family are based. Louis Emerick was cast in a recurring role as Tess's fireman husband Mike Bateman. His casting was announced on 17 June 2003 and he was initially hired for four episodes. The pair previously portrayed a married couple on Brookside, and also worked together in the play Playboy of the West Indies in 1985. The actors were excited to work with each other again and Packer felt their history aided their on-screen connection. Maxwell Caulfield was cast as Jim Brodie, a consultant paediatrician. He is characterised as a womaniser with an "air of transatlantic glamour and smooth maturity". James Redmond also joined the show as Abs Denham, a mental health nurse who is billed as charming yet "a bit of an oddball". Redmond explained that Abs is "fascinated" by people with mental health issues and wants to "champion mental health", becoming frustrated by its stigma. He added that Abs is unafraid of the hierarchy and will challenge anybody else's views. Redmond relocated to his hometown of Bristol for the role, but found moving into his family home challenging.

Leanne Wilson was introduced as staff nurse Claire Guildford, who was described as "gentle, happy glow as dependable and down-to-earth". Wilson explained that Claire is strong, confident in her decisions and excited about her work. The character quickly features in a story about the end of her relationship with Keith, her boyfriend of six years. Keith is not ready to end the relationship and becomes scary, not accepting her decision. The character of Tally Harper was reintroduced to the main cast, with the role recast to actress Holly Davidson. Tally is the "troublesome" eldest daughter of Harry, who the actress called "feisty and independent". Tally cares for her younger siblings, following the recent death of their mother. Davidson explained that Tally resents her father for not coping with her death well. The actress drew on her own parents' divorce to play the death of Tally's mother. One story for the character sees her become romantically involved with Simon, against the wishes of Harry. The series also features the return of original character Baz Wilder, portrayed by Julia Watson. The character was killed off after eight episodes. Rebekah Gibbs joins the series from episode forty one as feisty ambulance technician Nina Farr.

The series features several recurring characters and multiple guest stars. Only Fools and Horses actress Gwyneth Strong was cast as Elizabeth, the former wife of Jim. It was confirmed in July 2003 that Charles Dale, Helen Fraser, Frank Windsor and Tracy Shaw would guest star in the series. Fraser portrays Joan, the mother of Claire's boyfriend, Keith. Wilson explained that Joan does not want to lose Claire as she sees her as a daughter.

=== Main characters ===
- Ian Bleasdale as Josh Griffiths
- Louise Brealey as Roxy Bird
- Maxwell Caulfield as Jim Brodie (from episode 2)
- Christopher Colquhoun as Simon Kaminski (until episode 46)
- Holly Davidson as Tally Harper (episodes 3−34)
- Rebekah Gibbs as Nina Farr (from episode 41)
- Kelly Harrison as Nikki Marshall (until episode 40)
- Kwame Kwei-Armah as Fin Newton
- Martina Laird as Comfort Jones
- Simon MacCorkindale as Harry Harper
- Sarah Manners as Bex Reynolds
- Suzanne Packer as Tess Bateman (from episode 1)
- James Redmond as John "Abs" Denham (from episode 5)
- Zita Sattar as Anna Paul (until episode 3)
- Christine Stephen-Daly as Lara Stone (until episode 46)
- Derek Thompson as Charlie Fairhead (until episode 40)
- Matthew Wait as Luke Warren
- Leanne Wilson as Claire Guildford (from episode 3)

=== Recurring characters ===
- Rebecca Blake as Julie Hughes (episodes 11−34)
- Tim Dantay as Adam Hughes (episodes 11−32)
- Sebastian Dunn as Merlin Jameson (episodes 2−3)
- Louis Emerick as Mike Bateman (episodes 1−11 and 24)
- Helen Fraser as Joan Jowell (episodes 5−9)
- Natalie Glover as Emma Newton (episode 40)
- Ashley Jensen as Stella Richards (episode 45−46)
- Victor McGuire as Father Frank (episodes 2−6)
- Cassie Raine as Kate Millar (episodes 31 and 39)
- Peter Silverleaf as Colin Evans (episodes 18 and 45)
- Kemal Sylvester as PC Robert Sagar (episodes 31−38)

=== Guest characters ===
- Peter Ash as Keith Jowell (episodes 3−9)
- Romy Baskerville as Dr. Hilary Gilmore (episodes 3 and 11)
- Tracie Bennett as Gina Driscoll (episodes 31–32)
- Emma Charleston as Nicole Bird (episode 31)
- Clare Clifford as Pauline Harvey (episodes 36−37)
- Archie Farrow as Baby William (episodes 31 and 34)
- Liam Hess as Louis Fairhead (episodes 12−25)
- Julia Hills as Caroline Miller (episodes 40−42)
- John Joseph as Terry Hollingsworth (episode 27)
- Patrick Lichfield as himself (episode 9)
- Lisa Pavitt as Lucy Brodie (episodes 13 and 18)
- Tim Plester as Derek Moberley (episode 10)
- Mika Simmons as Gemma Lynch (episode 1)
- Nicholas Tizzard as Policeman/McCormack (episode 9)
- Julia Watson as Baz Wilder (episodes 12−19)
- Nigel Whitmey as Dan Wilder (episodes 12−25)
- Kristian Wilkin as Andy Brodie (episodes 8−22)
- Frank Windsor as Kenneth Samuels (episodes 12−25)
- Susannah York as Helen Grant (episodes 35−36)

== Reception ==
During series eighteen, Casualty was nominated for Best Continuing Drama at the 2004 British Academy Television Awards. The opening episode was rated the best ever episode in an online poll ran by the show's website for its twenty-fifth anniversary in September 2011. On a shortlist of ten episodes, it received 18.5% of total votes.

== Episodes ==
No. overall	No. in series	Title	Directed by	Written by	Original release date	UK viewers (millions)
401	1	"End of the Line – Part One"	Euros Lyn	Ann Marie Di Mambro	13 September 2003	9.17
The ED deal with a major incident as a train is derailed. Fin and Comfort, who are a couple, and Anna are on board; the former are unhurt and join the rescue team led by Mike, Charlie and Lara. Charlie finds Anna, who admits she is pregnant with her half-brother Merlin's baby, trapped by rubble with Nelson (Emmanuel Ighodaro). A boy, Roddy, has a tear in his heart and is rushed to theatre; his father Daniel admits sending him to the buffet car to keep him quiet. Nikki meets Paul (Lewis Lloyd), a boy who believes his parents are dead. Rachel Rees (Rebekah Joy Gilgan), a heavily pregnant woman, dies and Lara delivers her baby by caesarean. A woman dies from head injuries and rather passing her identification to admin, Roxy informs her mother (Maxine Evans). The woman, Sally Morton (Sian McDowall), appears alive and it emerges that her girlfriend had been using her ID. Tess defends Roxy to Simon, who has returned from his suspension to a hostile reception. While searching for his girlfriend, Amanda Belling (Kim Thomson), Geoff (Robin Herford) has a stroke. Amanda explains that they recently left their spouses for each other, before deciding to leave Geoff and reunite with her husband. Fin and Comfort find teacher Liz Merryman (Rhea Bailey) and her schoolchildren; Mike agrees to personnel evacuating them. The tunnel suddenly collapses with Comfort, Liz and five children still inside. Harry is taking medication. The full script for the episode can be read on the BBC website.
402	2	"End of the Line – Part Two"	Ian White	Danny McCahon	14 September 2003	9.05
The tunnel collapse has killed Liz, a child and multiple firefighters. Comfort is trapped with the other children and is helped to treat the wounded by a boy, Rick, who stops breathing; using a mobile phone, Lara talks Comfort through a procedure to save him, but she cannot. Although they are rescued, Comfort is devastated. Nelson is removed but Anna remains trapped; Merlin arrives at the accident, posing as a doctor so he can see Anna. Harry goes to the accident and amputates Anna's leg with Charlie's help. Structural engineer Colin Reeves (Tony Osoba) orders the area to be cleared, but Mike bargains for time to evacuate the carriages. Under limited time, Harry and Charlie drag Anna to safety before the tunnel collapses, damaging her other leg. Mike calls Tess, blaming himself for his team's deaths. Fin loses the engagement ring he bought for Comfort. Jim manages the ED; he treats Rachel's husband Jason Rees (Daniel Ainsleigh) and their newborn, as well as Tricia Cale (Devon Black), a stewardess scalded by boiling coffee. Tricia's mother (Heather Wright) argues with Bex in front of reporters, but later donates to the disaster fund. Father Frank (Victor McGuire), a priest, visits the accident and the hospital to reassure relatives. Nikki takes Paul to the hospital until social services can collect him.
403	3	"Breathe Deeply"	Peter Cregeen	Chris Ould	20 September 2003	9.50
In the intensive treatment unit (ITU), Anna has lost her legs and baby, and develops multiple pulmonary embolisms, becoming too weak for treatment; she refuses ventilation. Her friends say goodbye and Merlin sits with her as she dies. The department hold a moment's silence, which is interrupted when Claire's boyfriend, Keith Jowell (Peter Ash), proposes. Frank holds a memorial service, which an upset Comfort is escorted from. Nikki visits Paul and Jim warns her about becoming emotionally attached. Mike tells Tess that he has been suspended pending the investigation of his team's deaths. Roxy meets Steven Williams (David Armand), a homeless man using maggots to clean a wound, and takes him to the ED for treatment. Steven has a history of mental instability and attacks Roxy; she is rescued after lying that she is pregnant. Consequently, Tess calls for a permanent psychiatric nurse to be hired. Tally begins employment in the ED as an admin assistant. Harry asks Hilary Gilmore (Romy Baskerville), his general practitioner (GP), if he can stop taking the anti-depressants he began taking following his wife's death; she agrees to reduce the dose. Warren Charlesworth (Andrew Buckley), who recently had a kidney transplant, asks for it to be removed as his mother Maureen Charlesworth (Maggie McCarthy), who donated it, has been holding it over him. Simon rebukes the idea and Claire dissuades him by offering to perform the operation using primitive equipment. Charlie treats Edith Alwyn (Veda Warwick), an elderly woman who fell off her bike. Edith was an auxiliary nurse during the war and vowed never to return to a hospital, so Charlie treats her outside.
404	4	"Perks of the Job"	Gwennan Sage	Emma Frost	27 September 2003	9.51
A learner driver crashes a car into a shop, injuring proprietor Ranjith Mehta (Badi Uzzaman). His medical student son, Naresh Mehta (Sushil Chudasama), treats the driver at the scene, claiming to be a doctor; she dies and despite not being at fault, he considers quitting medicine. He changes his mind when he helps Simon treat Ranjith. Simon is offered a job at a pharmaceutical company, but declines it. Harry is irritable and distracted and struggles to treat patients; he tells Lara that he is experiencing withdrawal symptoms, but fakes her signature to get a repeat prescription. Comfort causes a minor accident in the ambulance after hallucinating Rick. When she struggles helping a widow, she confides in Josh, who sends her home. An air hostess collapses after trying to conceal facial hair growth; she has an ovarian cyst causing irregular hormones. Lara diagnoses a builder, whose colleague hit him with spade after believing he was being electrocuted, with Raynaud syndrome. Claire ignores Keith's calls, so he auctions her belongings at the hospital; Nikki convinces Claire to move into Anna's old room. Nikki visits Paul and convinces him to go with his foster parents.
405	5	"Flash in the Pan"	Roberto Bangura	Jason Sutton	4 October 2003	9.33
Lara and Luke launch the rapid response team (RRT). The first call is a woman who has driven into a skip; Lara is concerned about potential spinal injuries and prevents the fire brigade dragging the car clear. Josh takes charge when Lara is called away; he has the woman dragged out, saving her life but leaving her paraplegic. Lara's second call is to a car crash involving elderly couple Teddy (Donald Douglas) and Joyce (Eileen McCallum), who have been having an affair for 26 years. Teddy suffers chest pains but recovers, while Joyce collapses and dies without being assessed. Joyce's daughter reveals that the family know about the affair and refuses to let him visit her body. Larry Stanton (Charles Dale) arrives, claiming to be Abs, and counsels a woman who overdose following the accidental death of her dog. When Abs arrives, both men claim the other is long-term patient Larry. Tess eventually confirms Abs's identity and allows him to use a storeroom as an office. Simon suspects a baby is being abused, but is overruled by Harry and Jim; he later flirts with Tally. Comfort visits Frank but receives no solace. Joan visits Claire to plead Keith's case, but she rejects his latest proposal.
406	6	"Against Protocol"	Dominic Santana	Edel Brosnan	11 October 2003	8.89
Sarah Jennings (Christine Tremarco), a young woman with bipolar disorder, acts erratically and cuts herself while gardening. Her father, Tom Jennings (John Duttine), and Tess decide to admit her to a psychiatric unit, but Abs disagrees and wants her to resume taking lithium. Sarah overdoes and is admitted to ITU. Nikki and Bex plan a nude charity calendar to raise money for the train disaster victims. Theo Faulkner (David Bauckham) arrives at a brothel to find his regular dancer, Gemma Lynch (Mika Simmons), has been attacked; he calls an ambulance, but she strikes him with a fire extinguisher. Nikki believes Theo attacked Gemma and is annoyed when Fin prioritises him. When Theo asks Nikki to give Gemma money, she believes it is a bribe, but Gemma convinces her otherwise and donates the money to the calendar. Charlie learns that Josh's wife, Colette Griffiths (Adjoa Andoh), has filed for divorce, so takes him to the seaside to cheer him up; they fight some youths in a bar and help when one of them has an epileptic seizure. Jim treats a girl who has been eating grape pips. Tally seduces Simon in Harry's office. Nikki admits to Jim that she is not over her former boyfriend, Jack Vincent (Will Mellor), and they kiss.
407	7	"Can't Let Go"	Shani Grewal	Danny McCahon	18 October 2003	9.02
Kirsty Harmon (Sophie Leigh Stone), a young deaf woman, is moving out with her boyfriend, despite the objections of her father, Dave Harmon (Philip Howe). They accidentally run the boyfriend over during an argument. At the ED, it emerges he is Kirsty's sister's husband and is leaving her sister; despite this, the couple leave together. A man is admitted after his son threw a ball at him while he was operating a saw; Abs suspects that they both have Attention-Deficit Disorder (ADD). Comfort returns to work and tries to talk down a suicidal woman, but she is spooked by police and jumps, leaving her in a critical condition. Jim and Nikki have spent the night together and agree to meet after work. Jim gives Claire a lift home, but Keith spots them and attacks Jim as he leaves; Nikki finds him badly beaten. Harry and Lara are displeased with Simon and Tally's relationship and try to undermine him. Roxy admits to Bex that she is pregnant. Mike tells Tess he is resigning as he is struggling with his guilt.
408	8	"Truth or Dare"	Karen Stowe	Marc Starbuck	25 October 2003	9.06
During a scuffle with friend Andy Brodie (Kristian Wilkin), Jason Whitley (Daon Broni) falls down the stairs. Nikki and Comfort help him and Andy flirts with Nikki. It emerges that Andy kissed Zoe (Juliet Seal), Jason's girlfriend, and that he is Jim's son and has a sister, Lucy Brodie (Lisa Pavitt); Nikki ends her relationship with Jim. Claire refuses to see Keith, but accepts a lift from him when she discovers her father is in hospital. Keith reveals that he attacked Jim and lied about her father. During an argument, Keith is run over, injuring his leg. Claire confides in Jim and he agrees not to tell the police. Chris (Royce Cronin), a young man with a cut hand, is admitted; his date, Donna (Syan Blake), accompanies him. He finds her behaviour embarrassing and lies about having a sexually transmitted infection (STI) to scare her away. Eric Wilson (Kurtis O'Brien), a boy with a milk allergy, is admitted; his father (Glenn Chapman) accompanies him, but disappears after learning Eric's condition is not serious. Roxy suspects that Eric's father gave him milk on purpose, but has no evidence; Eric is discharged to his father's care when he returns. After much persuasion, Josh volunteers to photograph the charity calendar. Harry agrees to take part in the calendar on the condition that his friend, Lord Lichfield, photographs him. Tally spots Harry's pills and learns that he prescribed them to an unregistered patient; she tells Simon.
409	9	"In the Frame"	Declan O'Dwyer	Catherine Tregenna	1 November 2003	9.05
Gina Jacobs (Zoë Henry) is doing a charity run for her son Kyle Jacobs (Zac Connor), who needs leukemia treatment in America, with the support of her boyfriend, Joe Freeman (Paul J. Medford), and Kyle's father, Hugh Jacobs (Robin Kingsland). Joe drops Kyle while stopping his daughter, Polly Freeman (Jade Gould), from picking up a firework; Kyle is admitted to the ED. Gina admits to Hugh that Kyle is not ill and she lied about his condition to explain being late to work. Harry and Lara also realise this. Joe learns that Kyle has been told his "cure" is a trip to Disneyland. Hugh confesses to the police and Gina is charged with fraud and child abuse. Keith overdoses to get Claire's attention, but Joan accepts her son's faults and Abs convinces Claire to reject him. Tally tells Simon about Harry self-medicating; he blackmails Harry into giving him an easier time at work. Josh and Nikki organise the calendar shoot and Lord Lichfield offers to do it for free. Jim convinces Nikki to go to America with him by donating the cost of the tickets to the fund. Tess's car is repossessed and Roxy arrives to work in a sports car.
410	10	"Black Dog Day"	Jeremy Webb	Robert Scott-Fraser	8 November 2003	8.37
Lara is annoyed to learn that Harry has assigned Simon to the RRT. His first call is to a cyclist knocked over by Harry, who was trying to avoid traffic. PC Ronnie Smith (Robin Pearce) refuses to take Harry's statement until he is calm. Lara confronts Harry, who tearfully confesses about self-medicating and Simon's blackmail. A man, who has just been dumped by his fiancée for being boring, falls from a bridge while hanging a banner; he dies at hospital, upsetting his fiancée who realises that she loved him. Tess and Roxy treat a woman who believes that she has an STI but has actually felt the earth move. Lara diagnoses a fitness fanatic with multiple broken bones with osteoporosis. Tess treats frequent flyer Derek Moberley (Tim Plester) after a fight. Tess railroads Mike into accepting a cleaning job at the hospital. Bex announces Roxy's pregnancy.
411	11	"Falling for a Friend"	Ian White	Joe Turner	15 November 2003	9.49
Comfort meets Eve Shepherd (Tracy Shaw), a woman with a live for the moment attitude; Eve convinces Comfort to leave a café without paying and to con £500 from a businessman. He suffers an angina attack, so Comfort calls Fin and Luke. Eve steals the man's car, but Comfort only realises when police chase them. At the top of a multi-storey car park, Eve falls to her death; it emerges that she had a history of mental illness. At the launch of the calendar, Comfort gets drunk and has a meltdown, where she starts stripping. Roxy is shocked when plumber Adam Hughes (Tim Dantay) is admitted after impaling himself. She admits that she is a surrogate for him and his wife, Julie Hughes (Rebecca Blake), and bought the car with her first expenses payment. Adam and Julie are shocked by Roxy's job as she claimed she worked in a nursery. Roxy threatens to return the money and have an abortion, but soon relents. Lara takes Harry to Hilary for a repeat prescription and destroys evidence of his self-medicating. Harry kisses Lara. When Tally discovers Simon's blackmail, she throws a bedpan over him; she later tries to make up with him but he ends the relationship. Following an embarrassing encounter with an old colleague, Mike resigns; he apologises to Tess. Jim proposes to Nikki.
412	12	"Second Best"	Marc Jobst	Gregory Evans and Julie Gearey	22 November 2003	9.62
The christening of Shaun Forster (Maisie and Lana Richards) is interrupted when his father, Dean Forster's (John Burton), son, Jason Forster (Aidan David), arrives drunk and causes Dean to hit his head. Jason kidnaps Shaun and Shaun's mother, Sarah Forster (Claire Morrissey), calls the police, despite Jason being on probation. Shaun is returned by Jason's mother, Liz (Sadie Shimmin), who argues with Sarah, prompting Dean to suffer a heart attack. In revenge, Jason sets fire to Dean's garage, but later apologises. Abs treats Ethan Sanderson (Daniel Tuite), a man with depression who has stopped taking his medication and used a drill on his head to relieve the pressure. Abs refers him to outpatients. Charlie prepares to meet his former wife, Baz, and their son, Louis Fairhead (Liam Hess), at the airport. He spots Baz's father, Kenneth Samuels (Frank Windsor), and learns he has terminal lung cancer; Charlie tells Baz. He is uncomfortable about Louis's bond with Baz's husband, Dan Wilder (Nigel Whitmey), and suggests they go away for Christmas; Baz convinces him to let Dan join. Jim is given a permanent contract; Nikki accepts his proposal after speaking to Josh. Simon publicly rejects Tally. Lara tells Harry she wants to be friends. Bex spends the shift feeling ill.
413	13	"First Impressions" (Note: See also "First Impressions" series 9, "First Impressions" series 20 & "First Impressions" series 28)	Chris Lovett	Jo O'Keefe	29 November 2003	9.44
Baz decides to stay in the country to care for Kenneth. A man with emphysema is admitted with breathing difficulties. He displays signs of assisted suicide and confesses that his boyfriend tried to smother him; he ends the relationship. Baz helps Charlie resuscitate him and Charlie defends her to Tess. Children Daisy Whitcomb (Nia Jermin) and Freddy Whitcomb (George Heritage) are admitted and explain their mother, Alice Whitcomb (Kate Byers), often brings animals home. They are diagnosed with an infection from animal faeces. Alice objects to them being treated with medication tested on animals, but Jim lectures her about home hygiene. Tess learns that a cleaner, who poured bleach over herself, has been prostituting herself to patients and reports her. A drunk teenager is admitted and it emerges that he attacked a teacher, having previously accused them of abusing him; the teenager dies after being hit by a car. Bex is still ill, but refuses an examination. Harry and Lara go to dinner, where he asks her out again; she refuses and he reacts badly, especially when she flirts with Luke. Jim arranges dinner with Nikki, Andy, Lucy and Elizabeth, but he is delayed, leaving Nikki in an awkward position.
414	14	"Christmas Spirit"	S.J. Clarkson	Emma Frost	6 December 2003	8.95
Patrick (Samuel Clemens) robs a shop and takes customer Cassie Beresford (Kim Oliver) hostage. Shop assistant Sue (Angela McHale) tries to tackle him but is pushed through a glass table. Patrick drives off with Cassie but has a head-on collision with another car driven by David Beckham (Malcolm Scates); Patrick flees alone. Cassie's description of Patrick differs from Sue and David; Roxy learns that he is her boyfriend and the shop uses third world slave labour, so they were donating the money to charity. Roxy treats Patrick secretly, but reports them to the police when they offer her some money. Victoria (Julie Teal), a woman who has fallen off a cupboard, is admitted; after learning they are both spending Christmas alone, Claire matches her with David. A stallholder is admitted after suffering an angina attack. Lara learns he ignored an injured foot so he could spend Christmas with his family in Australia; he has developed gangrene and has it amputated. Charlie, Baz and Louis go bowling, but Louis collapses with a fever. Jim diagnoses him with Rocky Mountain fever from a tick bite; Louis relies on Dan for support but Baz is grateful for Charlie. Luke convinces Bex to be examined by Simon, who diagnoses her with diabetes; she leaves without treatment. Andy and Nikki kiss, nearly being caught by Jim.
415	15	"Never Judge a Book"	Euros Lyn	Robert Scott-Fraser	13 December 2003	9.20
A car has collided with a minibus containing a choir; the driver of the car is drunk and dies in resus. After realising that the driver was unable to drive, Abs realises that the driver's stepfather was actually driving and fell asleep at the wheel. The choir master and a member, who both have heart problems, admit their feelings for each other. Roxy treats Eddie West (David Troughton), an elderly man involved in a scuffle at a rubbish dump; he feels lonely after his wife's death and estrangement from their children. Ryan Collins (Nick Haverson), who scuffled with Eddie while looking for presents for his children, arrives with his son, Dean Collins (Tobias Vaughan), who has had an asthma attack. Eddie agrees to spend Christmas with them. Luke is worried about Bex and takes an ambulance to check on her, without Josh's permission. He finds her collapsed after drinking heavily; Lara revives her and she is forced to accept the severity of her condition. Kenneth arranges for himself, Charlie, Baz, Dan and Louis to spend Christmas in Lapland. Jim and Nikki visit a cottage, where Andy surprises them; while Jim is out, Nikki and Andy have sex.
416	16	"Eat, Drink and Be Merry"	Ian White	Jason Sutton	20 December 2003	7.71
On the family holiday, Charlie and Dan become competitive; Dan overturns a ski bike, trapping himself and severing an artery. Charlie treats him while Baz and Louis fetch help. Baz and Charlie confesses their feelings for each other and kiss beneath the northern lights. At the ED, Harry is distracted and instructs a hungover Claire to give a drunk teenager insulin instead of a diabetic. He and Abs realise the mistake, but Claire finds herself under investigation. Abs unsuccessfully tries to get the teenager's father to worry about his drinking. A woman, who had a heart attack at a work function, is admitted. She deteriorates and it transpires that she has a nut allergy and the colleague who resuscitated her had been eating nuts. Jim treats a girl who fell from a window; he learns that she has been living alone for weeks, following her mother's disappearance. Finn tries to cheer Comfort up by serenading her in reception. Nikki declines Jim's offer to spend Christmas with his family.
417	17	"I Got It Bad and Ain't That Good"	Nic Phillips	Robert Scott-Fraser	27 December 2003	8.50
A man is admitted following a car accident. He has a condition which prevents him forming new memories; when PC Smith arrives to arrest him for unpaid parking fines and failure to appear in court, Simon explains the situation. Soldier Darrell Kemmer (Gareth David-Lloyd) collapses after being given amphetamines by his corporal, Dale Charters (Ben Hull), following a fall. Dale hides his involvement and it emerges that Darrell has a head injury, disguised by the drugs; he dies in resus. Carla Fallon (Claire Carrie) is admitted after a drunken fall. Her estranged husband, Ewan Fallon (James Larkin), arrives and belittles her when in private; he tries to use the situation to take their children, Annie Fallon (Rebecca Bridges) and Tom Fallon (Henry Moloney), away. Abs suggests that Carla should discharge herself against medical advice; she leaves with the children. Baz confesses her affair with Charlie to Dan, who hits Charlie. On her hen night, Nikki and her friends bump into Jim, Andy and Simon. Simon leaves with Tally. Lara and Luke have sex in the hospital car park, unaware they are being recorded by CCTV. Claire spots Nikki and Andy together, so she admits the affair.
418	18	"Ahead of the Game"	Tania Diez	Chris Ould	3 January 2004	9.43
It is Nikki and Jim's wedding day; she jilts him and Andy tries to dissuade Jim from going after her. Nikki refuses to speak to him. Bex discovers the security tape of Luke and Lara having sex. A man with persistent headaches collapses, having repeatedly been sent home by Lara. Security guard Colin Evans (Peter Silverleaf) believes he has cluster headaches; Lara ignores his theory, so he tells Harry, who confirms it. Colin then gives Harry the security tape, causing an argument between him and Lara. Baz informs Louis that she has reunited with Charlie and Dan is leaving. Baz and Louis take Dan to the airport; Louis misbehaves and Baz removes her seatbelt to remonstrate as Dan swerves to avoid a car and crashes into a wall. Louis has a broken arm and Baz has a possible fractured skull. Charlie finds them and accompanies an unconscious Baz to hospital. Brian "Bullet" Taylor (John Castle), Bex's schoolteacher, and his wife, Mavis Taylor (Diana Weston), are admitted with carving knife injuries. Simon, Abs and Bex suspect domestic violence, but it emerges that Mavis has multiple sclerosis; she rejects Abs's suggestion of medical cannabis. A young man is admitted with a punctured lung after asking a woman to stand on his chest; Lara realises that he was trying to look up her cleavage. Luke complains about Dale to Major Topliss (Don Gallagher), so Dale has him attacked. Simon rejects Tally.
419	19	"Where There's Life"	Jane Powell	Ginne Hole	10 January 2004	9.77
Baz is declared brain dead. Charlie and Kenneth support organ donation, but Dan disagrees until he observes work in the ED. Ian Hardie (Kim Wall), a man in end stage liver failure, is admitted after a fall. His teenage daughter, Sophie Hardie (Jessica Harper), admits that her mother left years ago and she has been Ian's carer since. The staff let Sophie stay with her father until he dies, but discover that a transplant match has been found. Soldier Bryce (David Gyasi) visits Luke and says he is going to confess to Darrell's death, meaning he and Dale would be discharged. Dale tries to kill himself, but Luke and Josh save him. Comfort's neighbour, Jude (Elyes Gabel), asks her to look at Zanna Mills (Thushani Weerasekera), a badly beaten woman in his flat. Zanna claims Jude attacked her while on drugs, but Jude claims Zanna is a stalker and broke into his flat. Charlie argues with a woman who refuses to care for her mother at home, meaning she needs admitting. A girl is admitted with a broken arm after running away from a car accident that she and her friends caused by throwing stones at cars. Mavis visits Abs, who puts her in contact with a cannabis dealer. Nikki discovers Andy has a girlfriend and only had sex with her to prove she was not right for Jim.
420	20	"No Weddings and a Funeral"	John Greening	Richard Vincent	17 January 2004	10.11
Harry, Simon and Roxy revive a woman who had a heart attack. She tells Roxy she had a near death experience and wonders why she was sent back when she has done nothing with her life; Roxy convinces her to take an open university course. Charlie and Josh attend Baz's funeral and Charlie is concerned that Dan intends to take Louis back to Canada. A neighbourly dispute in which James's building work threatened the tree Norman planted for his late wife has resulted in James being sprayed in the eyes with paint, meaning he might go blind, and Norman being hit in the head with a shovel. James's wife Beth attacks Norman in the department and hits Lara. Harry uses this as another excuse to criticise Lara but she tells him the nurses are picking up on his unprofessional attitude and Tess is threatening to report him. Norman deteriorates and dies, meaning James could be charged with manslaughter. Mavis comes in after experiencing an allergic reaction to cannabis. Simon convinces Abs to apologise and Brian agrees not to take it further. Lara treats a woman who twisted her ankle in a rabbit hole after skydiving. Luke and Nikki are called out to a couple giving birth on a ley line; the boyfriend panicked and phoned them but the woman refuses medical help, even though it turns out she never had tests and didn't know she was expecting twins. She is unhappy when they are taken to hospital and tries to remove them, but accepts help when the baby girl stops breathing. Jim questions Claire who lets slip that Nikki and Andy slept together. Guest starring John Castle, Diana Weston and Hilary Crane
421	21	"Emotional Rescue – Part One"	Ian White	Ginnie Hole	24 January 2004	9.53
Harry, Simon and Lara are away on a staff development course, leaving Jim in effective charge. He and Abs try to get Barry, a patient with kidney stones, admitted but he ends up passing it without help. Charlie gets a court order to keep Louis in the country when Dan goes back to Canada. A house fire has engulfed two neighbouring buildings: Borko, who lives in one house, is brought in with the four children from next door, one of whom, Matthew, has burned hands. The girl, Kirstie, dies in hospital. Father Tom was out driving while mother Nina admits she has been working as a receptionist at a massage parlour and stayed late because a client gave her £250 to sleep with him. Fin catches Comfort drinking at work and sends her home. Things are tense between the trio at the team building, especially since Lara has slept with their instructor, Leon. They go into a cave system but Harry follows the sounds of another team instead of their route and falls, injuring his leg. Leon, who was watching from afar, goes to help but also falls, breaking his neck. Lara is unable to find the way out and ends up pulling down their rope, leaving her and Simon trapped with Harry. The other instructor, Stuart, calls Mountain Rescue. With water pouring into the crevice, the doctors accept there is nothing they can do for Leon and attempt to climb through an underwater passage to safety but Simon hits his head and lies unconscious in the water. Guest starring Benjamin Morris, Emma Amos and Danny John-Jules
422	22	"Emotional Rescue – Part Two"	Gwennan Sage	Stephen McAteer	31 January 2004	9.62
Lara manages to drag Simon to safety, although he sustains spinal damage. The trio are found by a rescue team while another team retrieve Leon's body; Harry and Stuart argue over who was to blame. Jim keeps the accident secret from Tally and the rest of the staff until they are brought in. Andy turns up at the department and is punched by Jim. Fin refuses to let Comfort accompany him on a shout and has to take Conor, a businessman having a panic attack, to the hospital on his own. When Josh finds out, he warns Fin they could both be fired. Tom is racist towards Borko, despite him carrying Matthew and Kevin to safety. Matthew tells his parents he started the fire to please Tom, who kept raving about getting rid of foreigners. Borko dies from smoke inhalation. Nina tells Tom that if the fire is traced to their family one of them will take the blame for Matthew. Jim and Abs meet Alesia, a doctor who is in jail for mercy killing two people including her mother and is now terminally ill. She asks them to increase her pain medication to fatal levels and also tries to get Abs to turn a blind eye to her stealing an extra dose of morphine but they refuse. Lara overhears Simon's test results and tells him he has a less than 20% chance of walking again. Guest starring Emma Amos, Sharon Duce and Danny John-Jules
423	23	"Passions and Convictions"	Keith Washington	Jim O'Hanlon	7 February 2004	9.26
A young woman returns from abroad to find her elderly father has handcuffed himself inside the house where he has lived all his life, which is due to be demolished. He is taken to hospital with malnutrition but slips back at the house. The workmen start to demolish it, thinking it is empty, and he is killed. A pair of newlyweds tried to get intimate on a ghost train only for the man to get his leg run over by the vehicle. He will have to be admitted and Lara arranges for his wife to stay with him. A vicar brings in one of his parishioners who has been beaten up. In fact, he is the secret boyfriend of the vicar's ward who was subjected to a homophobic attack. The ward reveals the relationship to the vicar even if it means not being welcome at the church. Lara continues to visit Simon who gets feeling back in his foot. Charlie has a meeting about custody and is disheartened by how little he knows about Louis and his life in Canada. Nikki gives Claire the cold shoulder before admitting she's pregnant and doesn't know whether Jim or Andy is the father. Fin plans a romantic meal with Comfort but she goes out with Luke and comes home drunk. Fin walks out and instinctively pushes Comfort over when she tries to stop him leaving. Guest starring Freddie Jones, Chloë Annett and Ben Faulks
424	24	"Fallen Hero"	Peter Butler	David Lane	14 February 2004	9.13
A boxer, Glen, is training for a bout but a man who is filming them, Roger, falls through a skylight, injuring Glen's manager Andy who is on crutches after an accident. Roger turns out to be working for an insurance company who believe Andy is faking the injury, which happened when Glen was about to dump him for a big contract, and is proved right. Andy argues that when he worked for a big firm they took all his wages. Glen goes through with the bout but his opponent collapses afterwards and he tells Andy he is leaving him for Vegas. Bex gets a lot of Valentine's cards and Tess gets flowers from Mike, although he has to work as a bouncer at the boxing to pay for it and is injured. Charlie is nursing a dying Kenneth and worries he is not impressing child welfare. Simon is discharged; he turns away Tally when she comes to visit him but nearly kisses Lara. A heavily pregnant woman turns up having tried to induce labour so she can go to a party and is pleased when she succeeds. Another woman who has been trying for a baby turns up with abdominal pains; she is pregnant but she is horrified that her husband, worried that her slimming was making her more attractive to other men, had been feeding her steroids and anti-diarrhoea pills that may have harmed the baby. Comfort tells Tess that Fin hit her and he arranges to stay with Luke. Nikki tells Claire and Roxy she is going to have an abortion. Guest starring Ray Burdis, Liam Barr and Jonathan Coyne
425	25	"Taking Care"	Michael Buffong	Maurice Beesman and Danny McCahon	21 February 2004	9.61
Charlie attends the custody hearing with Dan. Kenneth has supported Charlie and Louis has expressed a desire to stay with him but things are less than certain. The court is adjourned when Kenneth is rushed to hospital, where he refuses further treatment and dies. Dan accepts Louis wants to stay with Charlie and they part on good terms. A teenager, Charlene, argues with her foster mother, Lesley, and ends up cutting herself on broken glass. Luke and Nikki come to collect her and Nikki ends up sitting on glass. Jim tries to send her for an x-ray but she doesn't want to admit she is pregnant so Roxy covers for her. Charlene calls her old foster mother Bella, who used to foster Abs, and is convinced to make things work with Lesley. A patient Bex left waiting in reception turns out to have a subarachnoid hemorrhage and is rushed to theatre. Simon returns to work in a wheelchair; his first patient tries to slip away having realised she is diabetic. Simon gets Bex to talk to her and she accepts treatment. Simon and Lara kiss but she backs off. Guest starring Hana Iquo, Terence Beesley and Belinda Sinclair
426	26	"What Parents Do"	Graeme Harper	Danny McCahon	28 February 2004	9.59
Simon is out of the wheelchair; his first patient is a man who thinks his pains are indicative of a chest problem but are actually a muscle injury. He later treats a man who drove into a bus shelter, who he previously treated for blackouts; the man has a sleeping disorder which went undetected because he ignored a GP referral. Harry criticises Simon's handling of the case but Lara defends him. Frank, who works in a chip shop owned by his son Kenny, has burned himself after a fryer overflowed. Frank is refusing to retire despite selling the shop since it reminds him of his late wife. Kenny sells half the shop to his brother Ged and they plan to convert it into a modern cafe with Frank deciding to move away. A young woman brings in her boyfriend insisting he needs his stomach pumped; Simon and Tess learn he ate a pie that she had hidden an engagement ring in, which should pass naturally. A girl is brought in by her father after an accident at karate. Roxy is suspicious and asks Abs to investigate; it turns out the father, once a violent drug addict, is banned from seeing her and her mother thinks she was at dance class. An attempt to hide the truth from the mother doesn't last long and Abs advises the father to seek legal access. Simon and Lara kiss but he refuses to have casual sex with her. Fin and Comfort are meant to be going to a counselling session but she fails to turn up after passing out drunk. Roxy tells Jim of Nikki's pregnancy. Guest starring Chelsea Halfpenny, Daniel James and Virginia Fiol. This episode marks the TV debut of Jasmine Hyde.
427	27	"Love and Loathing"	Nic Phillips	Jason Sutton	6 March 2004	8.94
Luke and Nikki find Luke's old coach, Percy, has tried to gas himself in a lay-by. He admits he raped his 12-year-old granddaughter Katie in her sleep. He takes an overdose but Abs realises the half-hearted suicide attempts are an attempt to have himself declared not responsible. Percy's son-in-law Peter and turns up and says Katie told them the abuse has been going on for two years. He threatens the staff with paddles to stop them treating Percy but Abs talks them down. Fin and Comfort are called out to a flat where an obese woman has suffered a pulmonary embolism; her husband explains comments about her weight caused her to shut herself away in the flat, putting on more and more weight. The lift is broken, the stretcher won't hold her and even the fire brigade can't get her out. Lara is summoned but she dies at the scene. A woman is brought in after collapsing at the gym and Simon diagnoses a salt deficiency. Harry questions it but Simon is proved right when it turns out she has been losing weight for her sister's wedding. A man comes in who has been having panic attacks about proposing to his girlfriend. The staff help him and his girlfriend accepts but then tells the staff she isn't going to marry him; he is her boss and she only started dating him to help her career. Jim tries to talk Nikki out of the abortion but she goes to the clinic anyway. Simon and Lara spend the night together and are seen kissing by a jealous Tally. Guest starring Sam Kelly, Tim Faraday and Rachel Gleaves
428	28	"Finding Faith"	Jeremy Webb	Catherine Tregenna	13 March 2004	9.25
Nikki is angry that Roxy told Jim about the abortion feeling she has made things worse. Simon and Lara look after a woman who had an accident dyeing her hair; she has been going on blind dates. Her latest one, a compulsive gamblers, turns up with an injured hand but Claire tells her he is married. Middle-aged twins Roberta and Mary arrive; Roberta has terminal cancer. Mary has been secretly starving herself, not wanting to live without her, and refuses help. Roberta never married because Mary claimed Roberta's fiancé seduced her; in fact, as she admits before she dies, he turned her down. Adam and Julie turn up to complain about Roxy still working; Tess defends her, even though she disapproves of what she's doing. At a boat yard, owner Greg's daughter Shelley flirts with his apprentice Cal, even though she is now engaged to someone else, and accidentally causes a boat to fall on him. Shelley goes to get Greg, who drives his car into a junction box. Fin and Comfort arrive and Greg and pregnant Shelley are taken to hospital. Comfort stays with Cal and a loose electric wire falls on the shed roof, electrifying the walls and the boat. If Comfort touches Cal, she will ground it and kill them both. She intubates him using a rubber coat as insulation and miraculously they both survive. Comfort's faith is restored but she tells Josh she is resigning in order to find herself again. Tally tricks Simon into meeting her but he rejects her advances. Guest starring Jaycob Ball, Bill Thomas and Sara Kestelman
429	29	"Parenthood"	S.J. Clarkson	Paul Marx	27 March 2004	6.48
A young woman with Down's Syndrome is brought in by her father after drinking a small amount of bleach. It transpires she is pregnant; her father hit her boyfriend on learning they were sleeping together and tries to organise an abortion without her agreement, but it transpires she drank the bleach because he belittled her. The boyfriend is brought in with a serious brain injury and the father is reported to the police. The daughter intends to bring up the baby without him and Tess arranges for social services to assist her. Teenage siblings Scott and Becky take Jason, whose mother lives with their father, with them when they use a model aeroplane. An argument between the teens results in the plane hitting Becky in the head. Further conflict at the hospital sees the parents nearly split up but they agree to try harder. Simon looks after a model whose breast implant burst; it isn't harmful but she will have to pay if she wants a replacement. Tally follows Simon and Lara back to Simon's flat and throws a brick through the window. Comfort tells Fin she has started attending church and AA meetings but still intends to leave work when her notice is up; he accompanies her to a meeting to support her. Nikki plans to move out. Roxy, who suffered a knock earlier, has a minor car crash outside the house and goes into premature labour. Nikki delivers a baby boy in the back of the car but he is rushed to hospital with breathing difficulties. Guest starring Amey Hutchinson, Norman Pace and Simon Kunz
430	30	"Another Perfect Day"	Declan O'Dwyer	Chris Ould	3 April 2004	8.87
A teenager has suffered minor injuries after an accident on a stolen scooter. As he is being discharged, his father is brought in, having collided with a taxi. After he and his son argue, it transpires he has a heart injury and he dies. A young man and woman who were in the taxi are brought in. The woman has facial injuries and tells her boyfriend she has been having an affair with the man she was with; in fact, she barely knows him but was giving her boyfriend an opportunity to leave her. Claire stops the other man stealing from her bag. Tally tells Harry that Simon has been hassling her. Harry tells Simon to stay away from her and also announces his and Lara's relationship to the department. Baby William is in paediatric intensive care but has a seizure; he has a bleed on the brain and may be left with brain damage. Adam and Julie aren't sure if they can look after him so Roxy vows to stand by him. Guest starring Victoria Pritchard, Marcus Smith and Julie Buckfield
431	31	"I Love You, I Hate You"	Gwennan Sage	Stephen McAteer	10 April 2004	7.27
Claire and Nikki are looking after Nicole while Roxy spends all her time with William. All of them are tired and Tess suspects they aren't coping, suggesting to Roxy that she give William up for adoption. Abs treats a boy, Mickey, whose mother Gina hit him for not eating. It turns out his gums have grown over his teeth, which a trip to the dentist will sort. A young woman is brought in after collapsing. Tally deliberately withholds the fact she was on steroid treatment to make Lara look bad. She realises how serious the situation is when the patients deteriorates and afterwards Simon and Lara confront her. Josh and Luke pick up a goth who was beaten up at a council estate. They later get a hoax call to the estate during which a heroin addict, Greg Millar, hides in the ambulance. He takes Luke hostage in the back with a gun so Josh will keep driving but Luke refuses to give him drugs, knowing he will overdose. They struggle and the gun goes off, hitting Greg in the stomach. He dies in hospital and Luke is left facing an enquiry, which Greg's wife Kate blaming him. Guest starring Nicholas Aaron, David Annen and Joseph Aston
432	32	"Forget Me Not"	Dominic Lees	Peter Mills	17 April 2004	8.59
Josh and Luke are called out to a set of flats where they find a man, Toby, collapsed from a drug overdose having just had a kidney removed and his pre-school son Zane with minor injuries. It eventually transpires that Toby was clean; his estranged wife Tina gave him the drugs after he agreed to sell a kidney to pay off her debts to her dealers. When it becomes clear Tina has no intention of quitting drugs, Toby agrees to Zane going into care until he recovers. Josh has to suspend Luke pending an investigation into Greg's death. Lara reports Tally when she sends a patient home without medication and Harry has to suspend her; it is Beth's birthday. Julie and Adam tell Roxy they will look after William even if he is disabled. Mickey is brought in by his father Ken; Gina took him off his epilepsy medication after misunderstanding Abs's instructions. Simon refuses to back Abs up. A man is brought in after a car accident when his teenage son was driving. He has terminal cancer and his wife wants to withdraw treatment. Tally talks to the son, admitting she still blames herself for Beth's death. The mother is convinced to tell the son the full extent of his father's condition and he agrees to abandon resuscitation. Simon and Lara attend a ball together and she is distressed to find he has speed on him. Tally is found collapsed in the toilets from an overdose. Guest starring Joel Dommett, Kate Duchêne and Joseph Aston This episode sees the suspension of Paramedic, Luke Warren
433	33	"Lock Down"	Marc Jobst	Gregory Evans	24 April 2004	7.61
Tally is rushed into Resus with Bex finding an empty pill bottle. Jim manages to resuscitate her and she is taken to intensive care. Harry initially blames Lara but later admits he has been a bad father. There is a riot at the prison; a guard is brought in badly beaten and dies despite the staff's efforts. The prisoner responsible is secured in Paeds Resus. It is agreed all prisoners injured will come to Holby so all other patients are cleared out, although Abs allows Stevie, a journalist doing a profile on him, to stay. She tries to secretly record an interview with Terry, a prisoner who says they were protesting against over crowding, and Abs throws her out despite her threatening to run with the Mickey Driscoll story. Simon, Lara and Roxy are all recalled to duty and Roxy befriends Matty, a prisoner with cuts that Tess thinks were self-harming. A gang member who faked an injury slips a stun gun to a prisoner who uses it on a guard and takes Roxy hostage but Matty saves her. An elderly long-term prisoner wants to go back to the prison, seeing it as home; tests show he has terminal cancer and one of the guards delights in telling him. Abs threatens to report him. The prisoners are sent back to the prison hospital. Desperate to win Lara over, Simon asks her to move in with him. Guest starring Josie D'Arby, Martin Compston and David Simeon
434	34	"Much Wants More"	Jane Powell	Linda Thompson	1 May 2004	7.55
Abs's mishap with Mickey is in the papers but Tess advises him to keep working. An elderly woman falls down the stairs at a care home and is left in a state of shock. A male resident accompanies her to the hospital. Lara and Claire find evidence of physical and sexual abuse. The manager initially claims his wife handles things, then admits she left him recently and he has struggled to cope. Claire finds the male resident forcing medicine down the woman's throat and is briefly held hostage by him until Lara talks him down: He was behind the abuse and is arrested. Lara visits Tally and they reconcile. Harry decide to take leave and take Tally away for a while, leaving Jim in charge. Lara declines to move in with Simon. Roxy runs to Neonatal when she learns Julie tried to call her, but finds William is now breathing unaided. She tells Julie she can't have any more contact with them. A car has driven into scaffolding outside a house, causing a builder to fall, and then driven off. The home owner, Lewis, who works nights, fell asleep and lost his young son Sean, who is found buried under rubble in a skip. He is rushed to hospital but dies. Lewis's wife Celia, who was at work, argues with him and Lewis blames Abs, recognising him from the paper. A man comes in with facial injuries caused by his wife, who has severe PMT: She turns out to have been the car driver and is arrested. Simon finds Abs badly beaten outside. Guest starring Israel Aduramo, Jerome Willis and Mike Grady This episode sees the departure of Tally Harper and the hiatus of Consultant, Harry Harper
435	35	"Breaking Point"	Terry Iland	Jackie Pavlenko	8 May 2004	8.62
Abs returns to work after his beating and is placed in triage but annoys Jim by continually sending him minor injuries. Abs admits his confidence is shot and Tess tells him to go home early. Jim meets with Helen Grant and proposes abolishing moving patients out of Emergency within three hours, which would ease the pressure on wards. Charlie and Tess suspect him of career climbing. A young woman finds her salon on fire; a friend tries to fight the fire but causes some aerosols to explode, with the salon owner getting the worst of it. She is annoyed when she finds her friend started the fire by falling asleep with a lit cigarette. It turns out the friend knows she has Hodgkin's Disease: Lara tells her it is treatable. A boy is brought in by his father and it turns out giving him aspirin for flu has given him Reye syndrome. However, the experience does leave his estranged parents reconciled. Luke visits and arranges a drink with Bex. A man with an injured ankle that Jim sent away is run over and killed in the car park. Simon walks out and Lara and Abs find him passed out at home from a combination of sleeping tablets and amphetamines. Guest starring Hywel Morgan, Louise Delamere, Harry Landis and Tupele Dorgu This episode sees the arrival of Executive Director, Helen Grant
436	36	"Don't Go There"	Robert Del Maestro	Danny McCahon	23 May 2004	6.40
Jim's refusal to send patients to ward is clashing with the nurses' refusal to discharge them when they aren't fit, leaving the department overcrowded. Charlie talks to the Direct of Nursing, Pauline, and learns the wards have filled their beds with patients on the waiting lists. A boy, Nat, is brought in by his mother Kerry and turns out to have low blood sugar; his father Reg has been using insulin for body building and Nat got hold of a vial. A young couple, Chris and Gloria, are chased by the police: Chris took his father's car without asking. He crashes and has to be cut out of the wreckage. Chris's father Benny has been lording it over the neighbours since a lottery win and tries to get rid of Gloria by threatening to report Chris for theft. Chris needs emergency surgery and may lose his arms; he refuses to go into theatre without seeing Gloria so Benny has to ask her to come back. A woman who ran over and killed a boy five years ago turns up convinced it just happened; Charlie and Abs insist on admitting her for psychiatric treatment. Luke and Bex go to a speed dating event but prefer each other's company and share a brief kiss. Simon admits to Lara he has been using sleeping tablets and speed to deal with nightmares since the caves. Fin learns the ring he was going to give to Comfort has been found near the train railings. An elderly woman comes in with angina and there is no room in cubicles to give her an ECG; Charlie forcibly clears bed on the wards but she dies in reception. Abs wants to take the nurses out on strike and, when Helen and Pauline support Jim's policy, Charlie decides to approach the Royal College of Nursing about taking industrial action. Guest starring Geff Francis, Sandra Yaw and Dean Andrews This episode sees the departure of Executive Director, Helen Grant
437	37	"World Gone Wrong – Part One"	Gwennan Sage	Jason Sutton	29 May 2004	7.95
Harry returns from leave to find Charlie and Abs in meetings with the union; Tally has stayed behind in South Africa. Harry tries to set things right but can only stipulate that patients have to be moved within six hours. An elderly woman, Miriam, has been left on a trolley in a corridor for hours and her son Tom has to resort to buying a pizza to get her a hot meal. When Pauline gives an available bed to a patient with less needs who was about to breach twelve hours, Charlie drafts a resignation letter. A businessman, Michael, comes in with pains but Jim exposes him as a hospital hopper who taped a kidney stone to his back so it would show up on x-rays. Simon treats Archie a patient with a pneumothorax and a mistake on the x-ray causes him to put a needle in the wrong lung. He convinces Archie not to make a complaint and Abs agrees to keep quiet. Fin takes Comfort on a picnic on their afternoon off; he proposes and she accepts. A patient, Mary, has severe burns from an immersion heater exploding and Lara goes with Josh and Nikki when they transfer her to St James'. Afterwards, the trio go to a call at a jeweller's and are held hostage by brothers Karl and Damon, who were robbing it: Their accomplice Lee was struck by the shopkeeper, Awais, with a baseball bat and Awais's wife Salma was shot. It is decided Karl and Damon will take Lara, Nikki and Lee to hospital then carry on in the ambulance, leaving Josh, Awais and Salma locked in the shop. Josh gets free and Nikki hits the panic button. The police back off when the hostages are threatened and the group take refuge in a multi-storey car park. Fin and Comfort go to the police cordon but the robbers are spooked by a coincidental appearance of a patrol car and throw one of the hostages off the top. Guest starring Grant Gillespie, Bhasker Patel and Pip Torrens This episode sees the return of Consultant, Harry Harper
438	38	"World Gone Wrong – Part Two"	Gwennan Sage	Jason Sutton	30 May 2004	7.59
Nikki is the one thrown off the roof and Fin and Comfort are allowed to help her after the robbers have left with Lara in a van. Karl objects to Damon hurting her and causes him to crash the van and harmlessly discharge his last shot, resulting in them being taken in custody. Nikki makes it through surgery but Lee dies of his wounds. Damon blames his brothers for everything except the robbery. Miriam is transferred up to a ward after reaching the six hour limit. Harry notices the mistake with the pneumothorax but Lara takes the blame for it; however, she is disgusted when she finds Simon still has amphetamines. Fin and Comfort bring in a drunk who ran into their ambulance when they confiscated his keys. Tess meets Ben, an addict who is going cold turkey; he was on a methadone programme but his family had to move when their house was firebombed by dealers. Charlie and Abs get him onto a new programme but Harry refuses to give him methadone, resulting in him collapsing in the department. Charlie tells Josh he is going to resign and that Dan has asked him to run a homeless shelter that Baz set up. Guest starring Robert Gwyn-Davin, Paul Amos and Peter Forbes
439	39	"The Good Father"	Sean Geoghegan	Catherine Tregenna	5 June 2004	7.78
Harry and Josh speak in Luke's favour at the coroner's inquest and a verdict of accidental death is given. A boy with cerebral palsy is brought in by his father with an injured ankle; both know that the boy's mother walked out on them but are pretending to the other that she's away on a retreat. The man is working from home but collapses from a mild heart attack. The boy decides to ask Social Services for help so he can go back to work. Harry admits the boy against Jim's recommendation. Simon is struggling with withdrawals and considers confessing to Harry. He nearly admits a woman waiting for an operation who has vomited blood but Tess and Lara realise she is faking. A girl, Kirsten, takes her baby son Sam to stay with her mother Carol while her father Gavin, a recovering drug addict, is away. After arguing with her stepfather Peter, Kirsten returns home where Sam falls ill. Gavin admits he mixed the powder milk with cocaine, causing an overdose; he is arrested and Kirsten goes to live with Carol. Harry is confused when Charlie tells him he's resigned and it's his last day: Josh and Abs intercepted the resignation letter. Charlie is convinced to take a six month sabbatical instead, with Tess replacing him as acting clinical lead. Nikki is recovering; Comfort asks her to be bridesmaid and Fin asks Luke to be best man. Nikki learns she has nerve damage and her arm is permanently paralysed, meaning she has to give up her job. Guest starring Richard Ridings, Francis Magee and Paul Henshall This episode sees the return of Paramedic, Luke Warren
440	40	"Dreams and Disappointments"	Marc Jobst	Jo O'Keefe	17 July 2004	7.83
Luke has returned to work and brings in Marcus, a teenager prodigy who cut his hands in a fall. Jim and Abs discover several unrelated bruises. Simon tells Harry about his amphetamine problem; he is resigning and this is his last shift. He tells Lara he is going home to Sheffield. Charlie returns to clear out his desk. A young woman, Lucy, hits herself with a paper weight and tells Neil, her stepson and lover, that his father Michael did it. Neil accidentally causes an explosion at Michael's tannery by lighting a cigarette. Lucy dreams of getting Michael's money in the divorce but he knows of the affair and has made sure nothing is in his name. Among the other casualties is Keeley, a teenage girl working there with her older brother Aaron. She is placed next to Marcus and realises he can't see properly. Simon discovers he has a degenerative optical nerve condition that will eventually leave him blind; Marcus already knew but didn't want to tell his father. It turns out Keeley is only fourteen: Her mother is mentally ill and Aaron is hoping to adopt the other children when he turns eighteen. Roxy says she will have to call Social Services and Keeley tells Aaron she wants to go back to school. The staff race to Fin and Comfort's wedding. Josh gets on well with Comfort's friend Caroline, Luke arranges for Fin's father Neville to travel over from Tobago to attend and Nikki says her goodbyes after Comfort convinces her to go travelling like she planned with Jack. After the service, Lara finds Simon and asks him to stay and marry her. Guest starring James Haggie, Jane Danson and George Harris This episode sees the departures of Nikki Marshall and Charlie Fairhead
441	41	"And the Bride Wore Red"	S.J. Clarkson	Stephen McAteer	24 July 2004	7.69
Comfort and new ambulance technician Nina Farr are called out to a church; the groom called off the wedding at the last minute and the bride jumped from the tower before being punched by her father. Nina gets caught in traffic and drives dangerously on the path. She later flirts with Fin before discovering he is Comfort's husband. The bride admits she was bluffing and slipped; her father tells the groom, who walks away even though she needs surgery. Nina helps out at a car accident by getting the driver out of the smoking car by unscrewing the wheel and later chats with Abs. Josh has a disastrous date with Caroline: He has cooked chicken not knowing she is vegetarian, and left the bath running so the ceiling collapses on him. Comfort lets Nina patronise him before she finds out he's her boss. A female athlete is brought in after collapsing and admits she recently had an abortion; part of the tissue was left in the womb, causing an infection. Her husband, who lost a baby with his first wife, didn't even know she was pregnant. When he learns she deliberately got pregnant and had an abortion because she heard it released endorphins, he walks away from her disgusted, even though Lara doesn't see anything wrong. Bex attends a first aid cause and learns Luke is one of the instructors. They later kiss. Simon is attending drug counselling. Lara tells Harry they are engaged and asks him to ignore Simon's resignation. When he refuses, she threatens to report him for self-medicating. Guest starring Eric Barlow, Justin Salinger and Abbie Hurst This episode sees the arrival of Paramedic Nina Farr
442	42	"A Dangerous Initiative"	Shani Grewal	Paul Marx	31 July 2004	7.26
A teenager, Sophie, is brought in after collapsing and signs show she has recently given birth and has an infection. Fin and Nina join PC Davies in rescuing a week-old baby boy found abandoned in a flat. The flat's owners, Peter and Angela, have no idea where the baby came from but it turns out Sophie is their daughter: The father, Terry, is an older married man she had a fling with, who has convinced his wife they should raise the baby. However, Tess and Davies tell all involved that social services will have the final say. Harry tells Simon he can return to work if he undergoes drug counselling. Caroline visits Josh but isn't ready for a relationship; Harry and Jim take him out for a drink. Bex is delighted after spending the night with Luke, but after she tries to arrange a dinner, Luke admits he finds her too controlling. Two students try to get to the bar through the sewers for a date but one of them has an epileptic seizure and the other falls while going for help and crushes his hand. Nina takes breathing gear to search for the first one and keeps him alive until the fire brigade arrive. Fin criticises her for ignoring protocol but covers for her with Josh. However, Comfort threatens to report her. Guest starring Sartaj Garewal, Michael J. Jackson and Joanne Zorian
443	43	"Inside Out"	Dominic Lees	Paul Ebbs	7 August 2004	7.00
Ambulances are called to a collision between a bus and a car, caused when the bus swerved to avoid an elderly woman, who has facial injuries. The woman is taken to hospital and her husband sits with her as she dies. As he leaves, he runs into his wife: The dead woman stole her handbag. Although the shock causes him to collapse, both are grateful to be reunited. Nina fails to clear the scene at the accident and Comfort has to stop onlookers using a lighter. She reports Nina's breaches of protocol to Josh, who tells Nina she needs to learn to work as a team. Josh is struggling sleeping at a noisy B&B so Jim invites him to stay with him. Simon returns to work, curing a boy of hiccups and asking Abs to be best man. Among the bus passengers are Carla, who has won a Slimmer of the Year competition, and her overweight friend Kim who she belittles. Simon and Tess allow her photoshoot to take place at the hospital but she starts coughing up tapeworms; she swallowed tapeworm eggs to lose fat. Andrew, the young man she is interested in, makes it clear he prefers Kim and leaves with her. Abs looks after a man who has attempted suicide; he fought off one bout of depression but can't face doing it again. Abs learns he actually has a thyroid problem. He gets in the car with the man when he tries to crash it and manages to stop him by revealing his wife is pregnant. Simon tries to reset the car driver's arm without full results and fails because of other injuries, resulting in Harry stepping in. Simon takes speed at work and confesses to Lara. Guest starring Geoffrey Bayldon, William Petrie and Shaheen Jafagholi
444	44	"Who Cares?"	Nic Phillips	David Lloyd	14 August 2004	6.78
Simon is still struggling to overcome his addiction. Harry closely monitors him as he treats a farm worker who lost a hand and Lara tells Abs about his relapse. A woman is driving her son, who wants to go to college in Edinburgh, and paraplegic husband but hits another car head-on leaving the driveway and suffers severe head injuries. Her husband, who has been in a wheelchair since a rugby accident, has been taking his frustration out on his family. He ends up in an argument with Simon but, when his wife dies, has to face looking after himself. Abs catches Simon being tempted by the pills again. An elderly man messes about with a young girl in a park and her mother pushes him to the ground, injuring his arm. She later follows him to the hospital and attacks him. Abs gets in touch with the man's GP and learns he has Alzheimer's. Tess treats a pregnant woman who injured her foot. When her husband turns up, it is revealed they are getting divorced; he hasn't seen her in six months and didn't know she was pregnant. He considers getting back with him until he learns she injured her foot on purpose to get him there. Abs looks after a man who injured himself climbing into a freezer. Jim has to bring the puppy he bought for his daughter in to work. Josh and Nina save the puppy from choking, working together as a team for the first time. Jim promises to arrange transport for Simon for the wedding. Guest starring Owen Brenman, Robert Cawsey and Lynn Kitch
445	45	"Love, Honour & Betray"	Declan O'Dwyer	Gregory Evans	21 August 2004	6.78
A young Asian man, Mo, leaves his pregnant girlfriend Tas alone in their flat. Comfort and Nina later find she has been attacked after being called out to a domestic. Tess and the police suspect Mo, but when her father and brother turn up at the hospital and cause trouble, Roxy realise they were responsible. Mo explains he and Tas were dating when her family took her to Pakistan and forced her into an arranged marriage. They carried on seeing each other while her husband was waiting for a visa and ran away when she got pregnant. Tas has an emergency caesarean; now she has had a baby, her family will disown her and leave her in peace. A man, Bobby, is brought in after collapsing; Stella, the woman he was with, admits he is in the process of leaving his wife Norma for her. Simon discovers he has had a stroke that will leave him disabled and Stella feels she can't nurse him, although Norma sees them saying goodbye. Stella gives Simon her number. Lara gets the details of the stag party from Abs and turns up there with her hens. Claire tries to plead Bex's case to Luke but he ends up kissing her instead. Simon is annoyed that Lara didn't trust him and goes round to see Stella. Guest starring Karen Archer, David Farrington and Pushpinder Chani
446	46	"Ring of Truth"	Ian White	Danny McCahon	28 August 2004	7.75
A five-year-old girl is brought in after being badly burned in a house fire; her mother explains the boy next door is being targeted by bullies and the flat was firebombed with the fire spreading. The neighbour turns up with burned hands and admits the council refused to rehouse them, claiming the attacks were random, so he set fire to his own flat thinking the neighbours were on holiday. He is arrested. A man is brought in with muscle pains after falling down the stairs and discovered to have a form of arthritis caused by chlamydia. His wife, the only person he has ever been with, admits to a drunken one night stand and they are both referred to an STD clinic. Abs is shocked to find Simon has spent the night with Stella and ends up being replaced as best man by Jim, who has arranged to fly Simon to the venue in a small plane. While setting up for the wedding, Luke tells Claire he wants to be with her, not Bex. Bex overhears and she and Claire end up in a catfight. Abs accompanies Josh and Nina on a shout, where a man with a severed finger insists on staying to find his wedding ring. He goes to the venue and tells Lara of Simon's cheating. Harry arrives after changing his mind about attending and ends up driving Lara to the airport, where she has booked a one-way ticket to Australia. Lara rings Simon and he responds by trying to take drugs and causing the plane to crash. Jim gets clear but Simon is caught in the plane's explosion. Guest starring Sara Hunter, Guy Masterson and Andrew Westfield This episode sees the departure of Registrar Lara Stone and the death of Registrar Simon Kaminski

=== Documentaries ===
No.	Title	Directed by	Original release date
1	"Making it at Holby"	Nick Bray	23 March 2004
Part of BBC Talent Week, this special follows the casting of three new characters for Holby City and Casualty, capturing the actors' selection and first steps on set.
2	"Casualty Saved My Life"	Mark Scott & Paul Vanezis	15 June 2004
Combining real-life stories, dramatic reenactments, and clips from the BBC One drama, this special explores how first-aid tips from the show have made a difference off-screen.
