= Van Wilder: The Rise of Taj =

2006 film by Mort Nathan

National Lampoon's Van Wilder: The Rise of Taj
- Theatrical release poster
- Directed by: Mort Nathan
- Written by: David Drew Gallagher
- Produced by: Peter Abrams; Michelle Fox; Robert L. Levy; Kal Penn; Andrew Panay; Elie Samaha; Natan Zahavi
- Starring: Kal Penn
- Cinematography: Hubert Taczanowski
- Edited by: John Axness; Sherwood Jones
- Music by: Robert Folk
- Production companies: Metro-Goldwyn-Mayer Pictures; Bauer Martinez Entertainment; Tapestry Films; Myriad Pictures
- Distributed by: MGM Distribution Co. (United States); Bauer Martinez Entertainment (Overseas)
- Release date: December 1, 2006
- Running time: 97 minutes
- Country: United States
- Language: English
- Box office: $6.1 million

National Lampoon's Van Wilder: The Rise of Taj (credited as National Lampoon's Van Wilder 2: The Rise of Taj in the film) is a 2006 American comedy film and the standalone sequel to the 2002 comedy film Van Wilder. Despite the film's title, Ryan Reynolds does not reprise the role of Van Wilder, and the character is absent from the film; instead, the film stars Kal Penn reprising his role as Taj Mahal Badalandabad from the first film.

== Plot ==
Taj Badalandabad, the personal assistant to Van Wilder, has just graduated Coolidge College and is now on his way to England's Camford University. Following in the footsteps of his father, he plans not only to obtain a degree, but also to become a member of the exclusive campus Fraternal Guild, the Fox and Hounds. There Taj hopes to become the next generation of Badalandabads to be aptly nicknamed the "Sultan of Snatch".

However, when Taj arrives at Camford, he is told by Pip Everett, the Earl of Grey, the arrogant leader of the Fox and Hounds, that there had been a mistake and he has actually not been accepted into the Fraternal Guild. Heartbroken, Taj, with his faithful bulldog Balzac in tow, instead takes the only housing opening available on campus and becomes the "Head of House" for a group of student misfits: Gethin, a nerd; Sadie, a foul-mouthed, sex-obsessed Cockney girl; Seamus, an aggressive, English-hating Irishman; and Simon, a kid who rarely talks.

Taj considers what Van Wilder would do in the same situation, and in classic Van fashion, he takes on the challenge. At the campus Society Inaugural Ball, he announces to the crowd that he and his housemates are starting the Cock and Bulls, an exclusive society. They also declare their intention to compete in the Hastings Cup, a series of campus academic events and athletic compe.

Also, as part of his duties, Taj finds out that he will be a history teacher to his new friends and that his teaching supervisor will be Charlotte Higginson, an English beauty who just happens to be dating Pip Everett. He is instantly attracted to her.

Taj and Charlotte clash over his unconventional teaching methods until she points out that his new friends are in danger of flunking out of school because their grades are so low. He takes Charlotte's challenge to heart and starts turning them around—their grades as well as their self-esteem.

Meanwhile, much to the fury of Pip Everett, not only are the Cock and Bulls catching up to the Fox and Hounds in the Hastings Cup, but Taj and Charlotte are spending a lot of time together. Pip sets out to get rid of Taj by attempting to humiliate him at the Royal Literary Ball and later sabotaging Ballzac at the Camford Dog Show, but both backfire and Pip ends up the one embarrassed. Much to Pip's dismay, Taj and Charlotte are clearly falling in love and the Cock and Bulls are moving into a close second behind the Fox and Hounds.

Pip sets up Taj and the Cock and Bulls by planting stolen test exams in their house. The plan works temporarily, and they are about to get expelled until Taj steps up and takes the blame for the theft—on the condition that his team are allowed to stay in school. The Provost agrees to the terms, and he has to leave Camford. Angst-ridden, Charlotte tells Taj she never wants to see him again.

The Cock and Bulls are now left to compete in the final event of the Hastings Cup without their leader. But when Charlotte finds evidence that proves Taj's innocence, she and Taj rush to the Hastings Cup, just in time for him to compete against Pip in the final event: fencing.

An angry and vengeful Pip makes sure that the fencing match degenerates into an all-out sword fight, but in the end, Taj defeats him and the Cock and Bulls win the Hastings Cup. Pip gets expelled for planting the exams while Taj and Charlotte begin a relationship.

== Cast ==
- Kal Penn as Taj
- Lauren Cohan as Charlotte
- Daniel Percival as Pip
- Glen Barry as Seamus
- Anthony Cozens as Gethin
- Holly Davidson as Sadie
- Tom Davey as Percy
- William de Coverly as Roger
- Steven Rathman as Simon
- Amy Steel and Beth Steel as Alexandra and Penelope
- Kulvinder Ghir as Taj's Father
- Shobu Kapoor as Taj's Mother
- Gabriela Modorcea as Taj's Sister
- Jonathan Cecil as Provost Cunningham

== Marketing ==
In November 2006, Kal Penn and musicians Art Alexakis of Everclear and Jonny Dubowsky of Jonny Lives! toured college campuses, radio and television stations across the country promoting the film. A month-long 21-date Van Wilder Rock Tour headlined by Everclear and Jonny Lives!, started in January 2007 and ran through the end of February. The tour promoted the film and its soundtrack.

== Reception ==
The film failed commercially and critically, earning $2.3 million in its opening US weekend. On Rotten Tomatoes, it has a 7% rating based on reviews from 44 critics, with the site's consensus stating: "A low-brow comedy, minus the comedy". On Metacritic, it has a score of 21% based on reviews from 14 critics, indicating "generally unfavorable reviews". Audiences surveyed by CinemaScore gave the film a grade "C" on scale of A to F.

Dennis Harvey of Variety wrote: "The four-years-in-the-making, badly recycled (not to mention awful) sequel might stain the honor of the Lampoon label if it hadn't already produced several even worse films".

Despite the sequel's poor critical reception and modest box-office success, a third Van Wilder film, National Lampoon's Van Wilder: Freshman Year, was shot in 2008 in Atlanta, Georgia. It was released straight to DVD on June 2, 2009 to mixed reviews.
