= Graham's Gang =

British children's TV series (1977–1979)

- Genre: Sitcom
- Created by: John Challen
- Starring: Mark Francis; Melanie Gibson; Neill Lillywhite; Alan Corbett
- Country of origin: United Kingdom
- Original language: English
- No. of series: 2
- No. of episodes: 10

Production
- Executive producer: Anna Home
- Running time: 10 x 24 minutes
- Production company: BBC Television

Original release
- Network: BBC Television
- Release: 21 November 1977 – 14 March 1979

Graham's Gang is a British children's comedy created by John Challen and first broadcast by the BBC in 1977. It was nominated for a Best Children's TV series BAFTA in 1979, but has yet to be released on DVD. The series is described as traditional hi-jinks by the BFI.

== Cast ==
- Mark Francis as Graham
- Melanie Gibson as Mildred
- Neill Lillywhite as William
- Alan Corbett as Lux
- Tommy Pender as Robert
- Lloyd Mahoney as Keith
- Katherine Hughes as Denise (series 2 only)

== Situation ==
The gang consisted of five boys – Graham, William, Lux, Robert and Keith – and one girl, Mildred. Plots often revolved around the boys trying to exclude Mildred, who would often use her influential family to try to force herself back into the gang. Graham's leadership of the gang was constantly threatened by William, whereas Robert and Keith were always on the verge of fighting. Lux tended to be slow on the uptake, usually a couple of steps behind the rest of the gang's plans. In the second series the gang were joined by a new character, Denise, who was Lux's girlfriend. The gang featured on an episode of Blue Peter just prior to transmission of the first series.

== Episodes ==
There were two series, each of five episodes, as follows:

Series One (21 November – 19 December 1977, 4:40pm)

1. "Saturday" (21 November 1977)
2. "The Great Outdoors" (28 November 1977)
3. "William's Week" (5 December 1977)
4. "Kidnap" (12 December 1977)
5. "Cameraderie" [sic] (19 December 1977)

Series Two (14 February – 14 March 1979, 5:05pm)

1. "Action!" (14 February 1979)
2. "Remember Remember" (21 February 1979)
3. "Mildred's Party" (28 February 1979)
4. "Only Fooling" (7 March 1979)
5. "Cordial Intent" (14 March 1979)

== Guest stars ==
Guest stars in the series included Michael Troughton (Kidnap!), Ivor Salter (Cameraderie/Mildred's Party), Brigit Forsyth (Cordial Intent) and Ray Burdis (Mildred's Party).

== Books ==
A novelisation was written by the series creator and published in October 1978.
