= Burdi =

Burdi may refer to:

- Buledi, or Burdi, a Baloch tribe of Pakistan
- Bardia or El Burdi, a seaport in Libya
- George Burdi (born 1970), Canadian musician who initially became known for his role in White nationalist organizations
- Nick Burdi (born 1993), American professional baseball pitcher
- Zack Burdi (born 1995), American professional baseball pitcher

== See also ==
- Burdis, a surname
