= Trevor Laird =

British actor (born 1957)

- Born: 11 July 1957 (age 69); London, England
- Occupation: Actor

Trevor Laird (born 11 July 1957, London, England) is a British actor.

== Biography ==
Born in Islington, London, in 1957, Laird trained at the Anna Scher Theatre. Early roles included a 1976 role in a TV adaptation of the Peter Prince novel Playthings, directed by Stephen Frears, and several Play For Todays: Victims of Apartheid by Tom Clarke (1978), Barrie Keeffe's Waterloo Sunset (1979) and The Vanishing Army by Robert Holles (1980).

Laird was a founder member of the Black Theatre Co-operative (now NitroBeat) in 1978 and performed in its inaugural play Welcome Home Jacko by Mustapha Matura the following year. He then had breakthrough roles in the 1979 film Quadrophenia – as Ferdy, a drug supplier for the main character Jimmy – and in Franco Rosso's 1980 cult classic Babylon as Beefy. He played the boy under the car in The Long Good Friday (1980) and appeared in Menelik Shabazz's black British film Burning an Illusion.

Later appearances include the 1986 Doctor Who serial Mindwarp as the guard commander Frax. He later returned to Doctor Who in the role of Clive Jones, father of the Tenth Doctor's companion Martha Jones.

In 1996, Laird played Hortense's brother in the Mike Leigh film Secrets & Lies. He played Wesley Carter in the TV series Undercover Heart, and Trevor in the British gangster film Love, Honour and Obey (2000). He played DI Mike Vedder in “End of the Night”, S8:E4 of Waking the Dead (2009).

In 2015, Laird appeared as Vince Thuram in the BBC TV series Death in Paradise. In March 2021, he appeared in an episode of the BBC soap opera Doctors as Samuel Asante.

== Filmography ==
=== Film ===
Year	Title	Role	Notes
1979	Quadrophenia	Ferdy	
1980	Babylon	Beefy	
1980	The Long Good Friday	Jim	
1981	Burning an Illusion	Pest	
1982	Walter	Errol	Television film
1983	The Bride	DJ	Television film
1985	Water	Pepito	
1985	De flyvende djævle	Sepp	
1985	Billy the Kid and the Green Baize Vampire	Floyd	
1989	Slipstream	Committee Member	
1991	Smack and Thistle	Baron Greenback	Television film
1991	Bernard and the Genie	PC Parker	Television film
1996	Secrets & Lies	Hortense's Brother	
2000	Love, Honour and Obey	Trevor	
2011	National Theatre Live: One Man, Two Guvnors	Lloyd Boateng	Television film
2013	Patriarch		Short film
2014	Family Reunion	Dad 'Grandad'	Short film
2019	National Theatre Live: Small Island	Mr Philip / GI / Kenneth	
2020	Education	Augustin Wood	Part of "Small Axe"
2020	To Be Someone	Rudy	
2021	Cruella	Asthma Man	
TBA	† Miss the Kiss	Gilbert	Post-production

Key
†	Denotes works that have not yet been released

=== Television ===
Year	Title	Role	Notes
1976	BBC2 Playhouse	Harmon	Episode: "Play Things"
1978	Play for Today	Bus Conductor	Episode: "Victims of Apartheid"
1978	BBC2 Play of the Week	Sheldon	Episode: "The Vanishing Army"
1979	Play for Today	Lester	Episode: "Waterloo Sunset"
1980	Play for Today	Sheldon	Episode: "The Vanishing Army"
1981	Maybury	Winston	Recurring role; 2 episodes
1982	BBC2 Playhouse	Albert	Episode: "A Pocketful of Dreams"
1982	BBC2 Playhouse	Heister	Episode: "Jake's End"
1982	BBC2 Playhouse	Frederick	Episode: "Easy Money"
1983	Crown Court	Patrick Shadwell	Episode: "A Black and White Case: Part 1"
1983	Give Us a Break	Ossie	Episode: "Streetwise and Nancy Free"
1983–1984	Struggle	Charlie	Recurring role; 4 episodes
1985	Big Deal	Monty Riley	Episode: "Getting Knotted"
1986	Call Me Mister	Harvey	Episode: "Frozen Assets"
1986	Doctor Who	Frax	Recurring role; 4 episodes
1987	The New Statesman	Lance Okum-Martin	Episode: "Friends of St. James"
1988	Tickets for the Titanic	Miles	Episode: "Incident on the Line"
1988	The Lenny Henry Show	Trevor	Recurring role; 4 episodes
1989	Birds of a Feather	Andrew	Episode: "Shift"
1992	Love Hurts	Wesley Thompson	Episode: "Walk Right Back"
1993	Us Girls	Give	Episode: "Series 2, Episode 5"
1996	Jack and Jeremy's Real Lives	First Bodyguard	Episode: "Restauranteurs"
1997	Grange Hill	Sammy	Episode: "Series 20, Episode 7"
1998	Undercover Heart	Wesley Carter	Miniseries; 6 episodes
1999	Casualty	Roy Turner	Episode: "Love Over Gold"
1999	The Bill	Jimmy Perry	Episode: "Hot Money"
2002	Holby City	Gavin Clarke	Episode: "Judas Kiss: Part 1"
2002	NCS: Manhunt	Don Deck	Episode: "Out of Time"
2003	Doctors	Phil Burton	Episode: "Nature's Way"
2003	William and Mary	Benjamin Manning	Episode: "Series 1, Episode 4"
2004	The Last Detective	Paddy Jones	Episode: "Dangerous and the Lonely Hearts"
2004	Peep Show	Laurie	Episode: "Local Hero"
2005	The Murder Room	Phil Carter	Miniseries; 1 episode
2005	The Eagle	Le Mabé	Recurring role; 3 episodes
2007	Doctor Who	Clive Jones	Recurring role; 3 episodes
2009	Waking the Dead	DI Mike Vedder	Episode: "End of the Night"
2009	Trinity	Barrington MacKenzie	Recurring role; 2 episodes
2014	Holby City	Tito Mullins	Episode: "Mummy Dearest"
2014	Toast of London	Nick Swivney	Recurring role; 2 episodes
2015	Death in Paradise	Vince Thuram	Episode: "Swimming in Murder"
2015	The Job Lot	Delmar	Episode: "Series 3, Episode 1"
2017	No Offence	Upjohn Henderson	Episode: "Series 2, Episode 1"
2021	Doctors	Samuel Asante	Episode: "Food for Thought"
2021–2023	Ted Lasso	Denbo	Recurring role; 3 episodes
