= Operation Good Guys =

- Genre: Mockumentary
- Created by: Ray Burdis
- Starring: David Gillespie, Ray Burdis
- Narrated by: Hugo Blick
- Theme music composer: John Beckett, Ray Burdis
- Country of origin: United Kingdom
- Original language: English
- No. of series: 3
- No. of episodes: 19

Production
- Executive producer: Jim Beach
- Producers: Ray Burdis, Dominic Anciano, Hugo Blick
- Running time: 30 minutes

Original release
- Network: BBC Two
- Release: 29 December 1997 – 31 August 2000

Operation Good Guys is a British mockumentary series about an elite police unit's bid to snare one of Britain's most powerful crime lords. It was first screened on BBC Two from 29 December 1997 to 31 August 2000. It portrays the total breakdown, professionally and personally, of the Operation Good Guys team. Throughout the operation, The 'Good Guys' have an unfortunate habit of embroiling into their calamitous world some of the country's best-known celebrities, from actors and footballers, to TV presenters and even the odd ex-convict.

It was created by Ray Burdis and co-written by Burdis, Hugo Blick and Dominic Anciano, although much of the dialogue was improvised by the actors.

The series utilised the concept of a mock documentary capturing the truths of a work place four years before the notion reached fame in The Office. However, this mockumentary style was watered down slightly when a laugh track was added for the second and third series as well as having standalone episodes instead of a story arc. Actor David Gillespie stated it was added after the first series was not accessible to viewers as a comedy series.

The series was awarded the Silver Rose for Best Sitcom and the Prix de la Presse, voted for by the International Press, at the Montreux Golden Rose Festival in 1998.

== Cast ==
The actors involved include:

- D.I. Beach (David Gillespie)
- D.S. Raymond Ash (Ray Burdis)
- Sgt Dominic de Sade (Dominic Anciano)
- Kim Finch, alias "Boo Boo" (Kim Taylforth; series 1 only)
- "Bones" (Perry Benson)
- Gary Barwick (Gary Beadle; series 1 & series 2 episodes 1 and 4 only)
- "Strings" (John Beckett)
- Mark Kemp (Mark Burdis)
- Accountant Roy Leyton (Roy Smiles; series 1 and episode 5 of series 2)
- Bill Zeebub (William Scully, QGM, present in the first series as a background character; brought to the fore more in series two and three),
- Smiler McCarthy (Hugo Blick; series 1 only, Hugo Crippin series 2 episodes 1, 2 and 6, & Narrator series 2 and 3).

There were three series produced, which featured guest stars including David Seaman, Jude Law, Sean Pertwee, Jonny Lee Miller, gangster "Mad Frankie" Fraser, ex Spandau Ballet star Martin Kemp, Denise van Outen and Donna Air.

== Releases ==
The three series were released on VHS in the early 2000s. In 2005, all three seasons were released on DVD format. In addition to the original episodes, the three disc DVD boxset includes some extras including a brand new episode, 'Where Are They Now?'. This new material addresses the subject of what happened to the team after they were sacked from the police force at the end of series three.

== Episode list ==
- Pilot – not broadcast, this is a less obviously humorous approach to the format, with the same characters. The overall feel here is more reminiscent of the United States show Cops.

=== Series 1 ===
- The Informant (29 December 1997): The Good Guys latest informant turns out to be a punk hairdresser.
- Radio Silence (3 January 1998): The team starts to get into money problems whilst trying to foil Smiler McCarthy's drugs ring.
- Frisk 'Em (10 January 1998): An American cop comes to lend a hand.
- Holiday (17 January 1998): Beach gives the Good Guys a day off to recoup.
- Safe as Houses (24 January 1998): A key witness is taken to Kim's house for his own protection.
- Open Day (31 January 1998): An open day at the station leads to problems when the Commissioner's dog dies.
- Sylvia La Plage (7 February 1998): The funds are gone, as are the Good Guys, and so has Roy.

=== Series 2 ===
- Back to School (5 July 1999): The Good Guys undergo retraining, and power goes to Mark's head.
- Stardust (12 July 1999): Jude Law and Jonny Lee Miller visit the station, in order to prepare for their new film roles as policemen.
- Forensics (19 July 1999): Beach is determined to find a criminal with a head cut, and also holds a special Sherlock Holmes weekend.
- I Will Survive (26 July 1999): On a survival course, Gary worries about their survival expert's interest in Hitler.
- Viva Espana (2 August 1999): The Good Guys travel to Spain for their next operation, which involves Ray wearing a wig.
- Operation Zorro (9 August 1999): Beach gets sunburn and the BBC worry about how low-key the Good Guys part in Operation Zorro is there.

=== Series 3 ===
- That's Entertainment (27 July 2000): Whilst De Sade and the others worry about a drugs bust, Beach panics more about a special Christmas episode of the documentary.
- Castaway (3 August 2000): The Good Guys are sent to a desert island, but Beach refuses to let the Good Guys go on a survival course.
- Raging Pig (10 August 2000): Beach goes into boxing in order to stamp out corruption in the game.
- The Leader (17 August 2000): Beach gets sucked into a weird cult.
- Jubilee (24 August 2000): The Good Guys get a visit from the most powerful and influential family in Britain.
- Operation Snowdrop (31 August 2000): Beach tries to improve the men's tolerance of minority groups, with the help of Assistant Commissioner Terra Blanche.

=== Additional episodes on DVD boxset ===
- Where are they now?
- OGG pilot episode
- That's Entertainment with commentary by Beach and Ash
- Music Selections from the Series
