= Final Cut (1998 film) =

1998 British film by Dominic Anciano and Ray Burdis

- Directed by: Dominic Anciano; Ray Burdis
- Written by: Dominic Anciano; Ray Burdis
- Release date: 1998

Final Cut is a film released in 1998, jointly written and directed by Dominic Anciano and Ray Burdis (who also appear in the film). It features several actors from the Primrose Hill set. It was nominated for the Golden Hitchcock at the 1999 Dinard Festival of British Cinema. All the characters (except Tony, played by Perry Benson) in this film share their forename with the actors who play them, a gimmick used in the directors' later film Love, Honour and Obey.

== Plot outline ==
The film opens with the cast gathering after the funeral of Jude to see a film he had been working on for two years. It turns out that the film is secret videos of all those gathered together in their most despicable moments including thievery, spousal abuse, adultery, etc. The revelations remove the masks from the so-called close friends.

== Cast ==
- Perry Benson as Tony
- Ray Winstone as Ray
- Sadie Frost as Sadie
- John Beckett as John
- William Scully as Bill
- Mark Burdis as Mark
- Jude Law as Jude
- Lisa Marsh as Lisa
- Ray Burdis as Burdis
- Dominic Anciano as Dominic
- Holly Davidson as Holly
