= Mum & Dad =

- Directed by: Steven Sheil
- Written by: Steven Sheil
- Produced by: Soledad Gatti-Pascual; Amanda Martin; Lisa Trnovski
- Starring: Perry Benson; Dido Miles; Olga Fedori; Ainsley Howard; Toby Alexander; Micaiah Dring; Mark Devenport
- Cinematography: Jonathan Bloom
- Edited by: Leo Scott
- Release date: 22 August 2008
- Running time: 84 min. Germany:90 min.
- Country: United Kingdom
- Language: English

Mum & Dad is a 2008 British horror film by director Steven Sheil. Its premiere was on 22 August 2008 during the London FrightFest Film Festival. One day later it was shown during the Fantasy Filmfest in Germany. The film is the directorial debut of Steven Sheil.

== Plot ==
The film begins at Heathrow Airport, where a Polish immigrant named Lena Malley is working a shift as a cleaner. While there, her colleague Birdie (Ainsley Howard) helps her to clean the toilets. The two begin to talk and Lena reveals that she lives alone and doesn't keep in touch with her family. Birdie introduces Lena to her adopted brother Elbie, who also works at the airport and is a mute. Lena tells Birdie that she doesn't get on with her family. While talking, Lena notices scars on Birdie's arm; Birdie explains that she used to have behavioral problems but states that she's better now. At the end of the shift, Lena misses her bus, so Birdie tells her that her dad will drive Lena home if they walk to Birdie's house.

Upon arriving at the house, Lena is knocked out from behind and injected with a syringe. She wakes up dressed as a child and tied to a chair to the sound of screaming coming from another room. Moments later, Mum and Dad enter the room and introduce themselves. Mum tells Lena that if she does what she is told, everything will be okay. Lena is unable to respond because of the injection she received earlier and Mum proceeds to inject her with a sedative. She wakes up tied to a frame, and Mum tells her that she wanted another girl to come and live there. Mum then pierces Lena's skin with some metal and carves some marks into her back. Following this incident Lena is taken to see Dad, who tells her that she will be a member of their family and that, in his house, she will follow his rules.

At breakfast, the family are watching pornography. Lena makes an escape attempt, but Dad grabs her, and Elbie drags her back to the table. Back in her room, Lena attempts to escape but hears Dad watching her through the keyhole. Over the following days Lena is repeatedly humiliated and tortured. She finds and hides a mobile phone but is quickly caught and put on heavier sedation as a consequence. A few days later, Lena catches the attention of a man outside but is seen by Dad, who drags her into his torture room, puts her in a suitcase, and repeatedly striking her with a mallet.

Meanwhile, the man from outside enters the house, but Mum and Birdie suffocate him with bubble wrap. The family then dismembers the man, and Dad physically forces Lena to kiss his severed head. They then proceed to cook the man's appendages as sausages and eat them. As further punishment, Lena spends that night tied to the kitchen radiator.

The following night, Lena manages to break free from the restraints of her bedroom while the family is sleeping. She makes her way to the torture room and finds a staircase up to an attic, where she finds a mentally ill girl in a bed. The girl begins to struggle, so Lena leaves. In another room, she finds a man who is being restrained. He, too, begins to struggle, almost getting her caught, but she calms him down and finds a weapon.

The next morning, Birdie enters Lena's room and tells her that it's Christmas. She goes downstairs to find the same man from the attic crucified on the wall and the mentally ill girl in a chair. Dad tells Lena that he knows she broke free the previous night and saw the girl. He explains that the girl is his biological daughter and that she was a "spastic" because the umbilical cord got wrapped around her neck during birth and that he had to bite it off with his teeth, implying that the birth didn't occur under medical supervision. The family proceeds to open a series of Christmas presents, but Mum reveals that she neglected to buy a present for Dad, so she tells him that he can sexually assault Lena as his gift.

Dad arrives in Lena's room wearing a dress and makeup and telling Lena that he is Mum before attempting to sexually assault her. Previous to this and unbeknownst to Dad, Elbie had taken pity on Lena and left Lena's handcuffs loose, allowing Lena to stab Dad with the weapon she had found from the attic. She flees downstairs, followed by a wounded Dad who trips, causing Mum and Birdie to rush to his aid. Lena stabs Mum, and Birdie attacks her, but Lena slams her into a wall and stabs her in the stomach.

Lena then opens the back door, but Birdie attacks her again, so she hits her over the head with an iron she finds on the floor and rushes outside. Lena climbs over the back gate but falls and twists her ankle. Mum and Dad rush out limping, bloodied and battered, chasing her into a field. Lena then falls, and Mum stabs her with a knife that she took from the house. Mum and Dad are too weak to kill her, so Lena fights them off and stabs them both repeatedly. Meanwhile, Elbie sets "the spastic" free of her restraints before strangling her as an act of mercy. He then walks out of the front door as Lena screams in the field as planes take off overhead.

== Cast ==
- Perry Benson as Dad
- Dido Miles as Mum
- Olga Fedori as Lena Malley
- Ainsley Howard as Birdie
- Toby Alexander as Elbie
- Micaiah Dring as Angela
