= Manchild (TV series) =

British television series

- Genre: Comedy drama
- Starring: Ray Burdis; Nigel Havers; Anthony Head; Don Warrington
- Country of origin: United Kingdom
- Original language: English
- No. of series: 2
- No. of episodes: 16

Production
- Camera setup: Single

Original release
- Network: BBC Two
- Release: February 2002 – April 2003

Manchild is a British television comedy drama series that ran for two series on BBC Two between February 2002 and April 2003, with seven episodes in series 1 and eight episodes in series 2. It was created and written by Nick Fisher.

== Premise ==
The show starred Ray Burdis (Gary), Nigel Havers (Terry), Anthony Head (James) and Don Warrington (Patrick) as four successful fifty-something men dealing with different problems such as marriage and children or life after divorce, aging parents, sexual dysfunction, lost youth, a succession of (younger) girlfriends, and the problems of how to enjoy the wealth and success they worked so hard to achieve.

== Reception ==
Upon the series' late 2002 debut on BBC America, The New York Times review stated "Classy and clever as the show is, its sadistic core makes it awfully hard to like", the show is "a dry martini made with toxic acid in place of the vermouth. You may find yourself neither shaken nor stirred", and, in describing one character's self-obsession, "his wife is well rid of this clod. Quickly, you will be, too.".

== Releases ==
The first series was released on DVD and VHS in March 2003.

== U.S. version ==
An American pilot of the series was produced by Showtime, starring James Purefoy, Kevin Smith, John Corbett and Paul Hipp. The pilot made significant changes to the characters and premise as it moved the setting from London to Los Angeles.
