= The Broker's Man =

1990s British television series

- Genre: Crime drama
- Created by: Al Hunter Ashton; Tim O'Mara
- Written by: Al Hunter Ashton; Tim O'Mara; James Robson
- Directed by: Roger Gartland; Bob Blagden; Moira Armstrong; Graeme Harper; Baz Taylor
- Starring: Kevin Whately; Annette Ekblom; Danny Worters; Holly Davidson; Al Hunter Ashton; Jill Baker; Sarah-Jane Potts; Charlotte Bellamy; Michelle Fairley; Trevor Byfield
- Country of origin: United Kingdom
- Original language: English
- No. of series: 2
- No. of episodes: 12

Production
- Executive producers: Brian True-May; Jo Wright; Patricia Greenland
- Producers: Adrian Bate; Carol Wilks
- Production location: United Kingdom
- Running time: 60 minutes
- Production company: Bentley Productions

Original release
- Network: BBC One
- Release: 17 June 1997 – 27 August 1998

The Broker's Man is a BBC British television drama series centred on the work of Jimmy Griffin, an ex-detective who applies his skills as a fraud investigator for an insurance company. Produced by Bentley Productions for BBC One, the series starred Kevin Whately as Griffin and ran for two series from 17 June 1997 to 27 August 1998. The series was filmed in the intermittent years of Whately's portrayal of Inspector Lewis in both Inspector Morse and Lewis. The complete series was released on DVD by Acorn Media UK on 4 February 2008. Each episode was a self-contained 90-minute story.

== Cast ==
- Kevin Whately as James 'Jimmy' Griffin
- Annette Ekblom as Sally Griffin
- Danny Worters as Dominic Griffin
- Holly Davidson as Jodie Griffin
- Al Hunter Ashton as Vinnie Stanley
- Jill Baker as Claudette Monro-Foster
- Sarah-Jane Potts/Charlotte Bellamy as Harriet Potter
- Michelle Fairley as Gabby Rodwell
- Trevor Byfield as Frank Mortimer
- Peter Firth/John McEnery as Alex 'Godzilla' Turnbull
- Grant Masters as William Addison

== Episode list ==
=== Series overview ===
Series	Episodes	Originally released	
Series	Episodes	First released	Last released
1	6	17 June 1997	22 July 1997
2	6	23 July 1998	27 August 1998

=== Series 1 (1997) ===
No. in season	Title	Directed by	Written by	Viewers (millions)	Original release date
1	"Double Dutch - Part 1"	Bob Blagden	Al Hunter Ashton & Tim O'Mara	TBA	17 June 1997
When a shipping container worth millions is stolen, Jimmy Griffin is put on the case to investigate a possible insurance fraud.
2	"Double Dutch - Part 2"	Bob Blagden	Al Hunter Ashton & Tim O'Mara	TBA	24 June 1997
A ruthless Dutch crime ring demands payment, and a string of murders follow. Meanwhile, Jimmy risks all to uncover the scam.
3	"Dangerous Bends - Part 1"	Roger Gartland	Al Hunter Ashton & Tim O'Mara	TBA	1 July 1997
Jimmy takes on two cases: a motorcycle and car collision, which left one driver dead and the other hurt, and a water treatment malfunction case.
4	"Dangerous Bends - Part 2"	Roger Gartland	Al Hunter Ashton & Tim O'Mara	TBA	8 July 1997
As Jimmy and his staff seek the truth, the two cases begin to intertwine in a dangerous fashion.
5	"Siege - Part 1"	Roger Gartland	Al Hunter Ashton & Tim O'Mara	TBA	15 July 1997
As things are improving with Sally, Jimmy joins his family on holiday. Meanwhile, he also accepts a case involving the theft of some firearms.
6	"Siege - Part 2"	Roger Gartland	Al Hunter Ashton & Tim O'Mara	TBA	22 July 1997
Hiding the assignment from his family becomes tricky for Jimmy as the volatile man at the centre of the mystery comes looking for him.

=== Series 2 (1998) ===
No. in season	Title	Directed by	Written by	Viewers (millions)	Original release date
1	"Pensioned Off"	Moira Armstrong	Dusty Hughes	7.58	23 July 1998
When a female police officer falls down the stairs at her station, she files a claim for sexual harassment, and Jimmy and his staff investigate.
2	"Horses for Courses"	Moira Armstrong	Robin Mukherjee	7.19	30 July 1998
Jodie goes to a rave with her boyfriend without her parents' permission. but she is found out after the club catches fire. Jimmy has doubts about how the inferno started, especially once he finds out who owns the club.
3	"Playback"	Graeme Harper	James Robson	7.03	6 August 1998
Two kids vanish, their bodies never found, after a boating accident. Months later, their parents are engaged in a public battle to combat the paltry sum they've been offered as compensation.
4	"Kith and Kin"	Graeme Harper	Ron Rose	7.09	13 August 1998
When Jimmy is sent out to exchange the ransom for some stolen military memorabilia, he enters the world of a Nazi sympathizer. Jimmy's office staff suffer a terrible beating at the hands of skin heads.
5	"Keyman"	Baz Taylor	Al Hunter Ashton & Tim O'Mara	7.88	20 August 1998
A board member of a construction conglomerate is shot dead in a brothel. Godzilla hires Jimmy to investigate a keyman insurance policy taken out on the dead man, which would pay ten million pounds to the construction company.
6	"Swansong"	Baz Taylor	James Robson	7.04	27 August 1998
When Jimmy's home is ransacked by neighbourhood thieves, he finds himself on the other end of the insurance game. Meanwhile, he's tasked with investigating an aging nightclub singer whose husband dies in a mysterious car crash. Vinny and Jimmy are both hypnotised, with tragicomic results.
