= Love, Honour and Obey =

2000 film by Dominic Anciano, Ray Burdis

- Theatrical release poster
- Directed by: Dominic Anciano; Ray Burdis
- Written by: Ray Burdis; Dominic Anciano
- Produced by: Dominic Anciano; Ray Burdis
- Starring: Sadie Frost; Jonny Lee Miller; Jude Law; Ray Winstone; Kathy Burke; Sean Pertwee; Denise Van Outen; Rhys Ifans
- Narrated by: Jonny Lee Miller
- Cinematography: John Ward
- Edited by: Rachel Meyrick
- Music by: John Beckett
- Production company: BBC Films
- Distributed by: Universal Pictures (through United International Pictures)
- Release date: 7 April 2000
- Running time: 97 minutes
- Country: United Kingdom
- Language: English

Love, Honour and Obey is a 2000 mock gangster film starring several members of the Primrose Hill set. It was jointly written and directed by Dominic Anciano and Ray Burdis (who also appear in the film) as a follow-up to their 1998 film Final Cut. As with Final Cut, most of the characters have the same name as the actors who play them. The film also features a cameo appearance from former East London boxer turned comedian, Ricky Grover.

== Plot ==
Jonny (Jonny Lee Miller) is working as a postman and becoming increasingly dissatisfied with his life. He asks long-running school friend Jude (Jude Law) to help him into the North London criminal gang run by his uncle Ray (Ray Winstone). As Jonny gets more involved in the image of the criminal world, he starts making mistakes and through a mutual dislike for rival gangster Matthew (Rhys Ifans) inadvertently starts a war with the South London mob, headed up by Sean (Sean Pertwee).

== Cast ==
- Sadie Frost as Sadie
- Jonny Lee Miller as Jonny
- Jude Law as Jude
- Ray Winstone as Ray Kreed
- Kathy Burke as Kathy
- Sean Pertwee as Sean
- Denise Van Outen as Maureen
- Rhys Ifans as Matthew
- Dominic Anciano as Dominic
- Ray Burdis as Ray
- John Beckett as John
- Trevor Laird as Trevor (credited as Trevor H. Laird)
- William Scully as Bill (credited as William Scully Q.G.M.)
- Perry Benson as 'Fat Alan'
- Mark Burdis as Mark
- Laila Morse as Laila

== Reception ==
On the review aggregator website Rotten Tomatoes, 33% of 18 critics' reviews are positive. Metacritic, which uses a weighted average, assigned the film a score of 23 out of 100, based on 5 critics, indicating "generally unfavorable" reviews.
