= Mark Burdis =

British actor (born 1968)

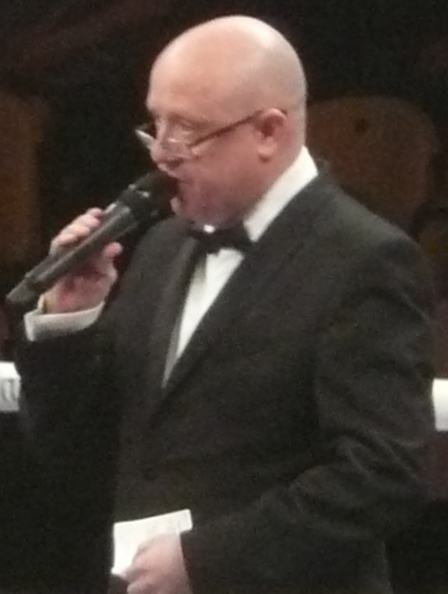
- Born: 2 March 1968 (age 58)
- Occupations: Actor; announcer
- Relatives: Ray Burdis (brother)

Mark Burdis (born 2 March 1968) is an English actor who started his career at the age of six. He currently works as a boxing ring announcer.

== Early life ==
He attended Holloway School and the Anna Scher Theatre in Islington London and he received the Rowena Roberts comedy award from Michael Caine in 1986.

== Television ==
Burdis is most well known for his role as Christopher "Stewpot" Stewart in the BBC Television children's show Grange Hill from 1981 to 1985. His later television work has included appearing in the BBC Television police mockumentary Operation Good Guys.

Burdis played PC Naylor alongside David Jason in the series A Touch of Frost.

In 1985, he appeared in To Hull and Back, the first feature-length edition of Only Fools and Horses, playing garage mechanic Colin, who works for Boycie.

Burdis also starred as Scatto in the BBC children's series The Roman Mysteries, and appeared in The Bill playing Joe, the brother of DC Paul Riley.

In 1996, Burdis played the role of Gary Rawlings, a rival fruit-and-veg stallholder to Mark Fowler, in EastEnders.

For several years, Burdis has worked as an announcer for boxing matches.

== Theatre ==
He has also played roles in West End theatre productions such as A Slice of Saturday Night and The Good Woman of Sichuan.

== Film ==
Burdis had a leading role in Final Cut, starring Jude Law, Ray Winstone and Sadie Frost; and starred in Love, Honour and Obey.

His appearances on film include playing the character of "Mark" in the 1990 release of The Krays.

== Personal life ==
He is the younger brother of director Ray Burdis.

== Partial filmography ==
- Never Never Land (1980) – Cliff
- Clockwise (1986) – Glen Scully
- The Krays (1990) – Mark
- The Runner (1992) – Marco the dude
- I.D. (1995) – Previous Team #1
- Final Cut (1998) – Mark
- Love, Honour and Obey (2000) – Mark
- Mike Bassett: England Manager (2001) – Mail journalist
- The Wee Man (2013) – Comedian
- Angel (2015) – Mark
