= Holly Davidson =

English actress and model

- Born: Holly Emerald Davidson; 26 April 1980 (age 46); London, England
- Occupations: Personal trainer; actress
- Years active: 1995–present
- Spouse: Sebastian Roos (m. 2019)
- Relatives: Sadie Frost (sister)
- Website: hollyactive.com

Holly Emerald Davidson (born 26 April 1980) is an English actress, model and personal trainer.

Davidson is most known for her recurring roles on the TV series' Renford Rejects, The Bill, and Casualty; and roles in the films Final Cut, Van Wilder: The Rise of Taj, and Essex Boys. She was a main character in the BBC's The Broker's Man (1997-98).

Davidson was raised in Shropshire from the age of 6 through to 16, and is the daughter of the photographer Robert Davidson and the sister of actresses Sadie Frost and Jade Davidson.

She married photographer Sebastian Roos on 21 June 2019 in Sweden.

== Filmography ==
Film
Year	Film	Role	Notes
1997	Bent	Girl on train	
1997	Food of Love	Jessica	
1998	Final Cut	Holly	
1998–1999	Renford Rejects	Robin Walker	TV series – Series Regular (13 episodes) – Recurring Role (2 episodes)
2000	The Grimleys	Mandy	Series 2 Episode 8
2000–2001	The Bill	PC Roz Clarke	
2000	Essex Boys	Suzy Welch	
2006	Flirting with Flamenco	Sylvia	
2006	Van Wilder: The Rise of Taj	Sadie	
2007	Perfect Woman	Kara	(in post production)
