= To Be Someone =

2021 British film

To Be Someone is a British film loosely related to the 1979 film, Quadrophenia. The film is directed by Ray Burdis and written by Pete Meadows.

Before the COVID-19 pandemic, the film was initially announced to be released in April 2020. The release date was delayed to 9 July 2021, and was shown in theatres.

== Background ==
The film is directed by Ray Burdis. before the release of the film, there was some interest in how the film would relate to Quadrophenia. The film stars some of the original Quadrophenia cast, including Gary Shail, Toyah Willcox, and Leslie Ash. This film was however based on the book sequel, which itself was based on the rock opera.

Ray Burdis has specifically said that the movie is not a sequel to the original Quadrophenia movie, though it does feature some of the characters, and is set in the mod subculture.

The film itself, does not feature any characters from the movie, unlike the book it is based on. Overall, the film deals with a young mod character Danny (Sam Gittins), who runs a nightclub, as well as a scooter repair shop. He ends up in trouble when he learns his club's secret financier is insane psychopathic gangster, Mad Mike. Not wanting to lose the club he loves so much, Mad Mike promises to sign over his shares in the club to Danny if he does a drug run for him. Danny tries to get assistance from the police, but the entire British Police force is controlled by Mad Mike.

In order to escape the wrath of the gangsters and reclaim his club, Danny and his friends conjure up a whacky plan, deciding to retrieve the long hidden stash of drugs from the Isle of Man and smuggle the drugs back on their scooters on the run. After arriving at the Isle of Man and setting up camp, they encounter a midget who warns them of a ghost in a haunted ruin. They go into a hidden underground chamber where they find the legendary drugs that Mad Mike wants. They then flee, after being scared off by the "ghost".

Eventually, they meet up with Mad Mike's gangsters, who are going to kill them. A rival gang of yardies show up to get the drugs, and there is a shoot out, but fortunately the police turn up in the nick of time and all the gangsters are arrested, and the main characters.

== Plot ==
The film, like the book, changes various aspects of the story. The film deals with the UK mod revival era of the late 1970s, rather than the original mods of the mid 1960s, and specifically focuses on the son of Jimmy, the main character from Quadrophenia. Two of the original main characters, Jimmy and Dave, make an appearance.

== Cast ==
- Gary Shail as Charlie
- Toyah Willcox as Bunny
- Mark Wingett as Tommy
- Trevor Laird as Rudy "Him gone out" Smith
- Leslie Ash as Judy

== Production ==
Filming took place in England. The story was written by Pete Meadows.

== Reception ==
The film received generally negative reviews. Mark Kermode of the BBC criticised it for connecting itself to Quadrophenia where the connection is vague at best. He referred to the cast as doing "sub Guy Ritchie schtick". Steve Rose, writing for The Guardian criticised the plot for not making sense, though said the music was lively.
