= Dream Stuffing =

- Genre: Sitcom
- Created by: Paul Hines & Su Wilkins
- Directed by: John Kaye Cooper
- Starring: Rachel Weaver; Amanda Symonds; Maria Charles; Ray Burdis
- Theme music composer: Kirsty MacColl
- Country of origin: United Kingdom
- Original language: English
- No. of series: 1
- No. of episodes: 10

Production
- Producer: Humphrey Barclay
- Running time: 30 minutes (inc. commercials)
- Production company: Limehouse Productions

Original release
- Network: Channel 4
- Release: 6 January – 9 March 1984

Dream Stuffing is a British television sitcom which aired on Channel 4 in early 1984.

The series followed the exploits of two working class young women, Mo (Amanda Symonds) and Jude (Rachel Weaver), who share a flat in a council tower block in London's East End, along with their three-legged cat, Tripod. Mo has a menial job in a glass eye factory, whilst Jude is on the dole.

Part way through the series, Mo loses her job and the two girls become a thorn in the side for employment review officer Mrs Tudge (Helen Brammer). Other characters include their gay neighbour Richard, (played by Ray Burdis), Mo's interfering mother May (Maria Charles), who runs the local launderette, Brenda (Caroline Quentin), who works with Mo at the glass eye factory, Bill (Frank Lee) and Mr Sharples (Allister Bain).

The series' theme tune, "London Girls", was written and performed by Kirsty MacColl.

The series was repeated once by Channel 4 in Summer 1985. It has so far not been released on video or DVD.

== Critical reaction ==
Martin Walker in the Guardian attacked it as "heroically bad", finding it a painful attempt to construct an "up-to-date and relevant sitcom" that turned out close to a parody of Channel 4's right-on output of the time.
