= Ray Burdis =

English actor, screenwriter, director and film producer (born 1958)

- Born: August 23, 1958 (age 68); London, England
- Occupations: Actor, screenwriter, director, film producer
- Years active: 1972–present
- Notable work: The Krays, Final Cut, Love, Honour and Obey, The Wee Man, To Be Someone
- Relatives: Mark Burdis (brother)

Ray Burdis (born 23 August 1958) is an English actor, screenwriter, director and film producer.

== Biography ==
Burdis is the older brother of actor Mark Burdis. Ray Burdis started acting at eleven years old when he attended drama school and trained at the Anna Scher Theatre in Islington, Greater London. In 1972, he made his screen debut in The Trouble with 2B by the Children's Film Foundation, a film series featuring the exploits of a class of schoolchildren and their science teacher Mr Potter (Richard Wilson). Later in 1974, Burdis appeared in a minor role in an episode of the classic BBC sitcom Steptoe and Son, but his first major acting role was at the age of sixteen, in the Thames Television series You Must Be Joking! , which he also co-created and wrote. He also starred with Phil Daniels in 4 Idle Hands.

In 1978, Burdis auditioned for a presenting job on the BBC children's programme Blue Peter as a replacement for John Noakes. Richard Marson's book celebrating the show's fiftieth-anniversary records this fact, and the film of the audition was shown at a BAFTA celebration in October 2008.

Burdis played the part of cowardly inmate Eckersley in the controversial movie Scum in 1979. He had played the same role two years earlier in a BBC television version of the story, although this was not transmitted until 1991 due to its graphic nature, leading to the cinematic re-make. He appeared as Kevin in the BBC2 Playhouse story Mary's Wife in 1980.

Burdis appeared in the Minder episodes "Not a Bad Lad, Dad" and "Hypnotising Rita", and played Joe in the musical drama The Music Machine (1979). He later had a small role alongside Daniel Day-Lewis in the film Gandhi (1982).

Burdis then played a supporting role as Richard, a gay neighbour in Channel 4's short-lived sitcom Dream Stuffing in 1984. Later that year, Burdis appeared in an episode of The Gentle Touch, entitled "Do It Yourself", as a man with a learning disability. In 1985, he played ambitious photographer Nick Tyler in the BBC comedy Three Up, Two Down. His character was the son and son-in-law, respectively, of the two lead characters, played by Michael Elphick and Angela Thorne; the series went on for four series, which were produced between 1985 and 1989.

He went forward to produce the feature films The Passion of Darkly Noon, starring Brendan Fraser and Ashley Judd, and The Reflecting Skin, starring Viggo Mortensen and Lindsay Duncan.

Burdis has subsequently concentrated more on writing, producing, and directing. He was the producer of The Krays (1990), and also co-wrote-produced and directed the movies Final Cut (1998) and Love, Honour and Obey (2000). He created, co-wrote, produced, directed, and starred in the television police fly on the wall docu-comedy Operation Good Guys for three series. The series was awarded the Silver Rose for Best Sitcom and the Prix de la Presse, voted for by the International Press, at the Montreux Golden Rose Festival.

He appeared in the BBC Two comedy-drama series Manchild for two seasons, with Nigel Havers, Anthony Head and Don Warrington.

In 2013, Burdis wrote and directed the film, The Wee Man starring Martin Compston and John Hannah, which won two Scottish BAFTAs. In 2014, he wrote and directed the film Angel, which was released in the spring of 2015 by Carnaby Films.

In 2021, he directed and wrote To Be Someone, described by its distributors as "a feel-good tale of modern-day mods, music, and scooter culture from the creator of The Krays, The Wee Man and Love, Honor and Obey and starring the original cast of the iconic, cult mods n' rockers film, Quadrophenia." It was filmed during 2019-20 and subsequently released on 9 July 2021. The film attracted negative reviews: Steve Rose in The Guardian noted "nothing really convinces or makes sense in this corny, amateurish nostalgia trip", Mark Kermode described it as "a bunch of second stringers from Quadrophenia doing sub Guy Ritchie schtick", and before it went into production, Roger Daltrey slammed it as "a blatant money making exercise." Conversely, Keith Haldon argued "it's British at its very core and it's a reminder that no matter the budget nobody does it better than us. Burdis has assembled a great cast that if you’re looking for that Quadrophenia nostalgia." Burdis later stated in an interview that he never intended for the film to be in the style of Quadrophenia (1979) and that it should not have been taken too seriously.

He has completed the film Miss the Kiss, starring Charlie Clapham, John Hannah, and Martin Kemp, which is currently in post-production. His next project as director is Last Tandem in Paris; production started in Brussels in March 2024.

In November 2024, Burdis admitted that he regretted "glamourising" Ronnie and Reggie Kray in The Krays, and was developing a new film to portray them as the thugs they were. "They weren't folk heroes," he told The Guardian. "They were just a pair of cowardly psychopathic bullies, who terrorised the East End of London in the 1960s."

== Filmography ==
Selected acting roles
Year	Title	Role	Notes
1972	The Trouble with 2B	Todd	Film (6 part serial)
1974	Steptoe & Son	Teenager	Episode: "Porn Yesterday"
1974	Play for Today	Danny Price	"Eleanor"
1974	The Tomorrow People	Johnson	"The Blue and the Green" (3 episodes)
1975-6	You Must Be Joking!	Various	6 episodes
1976	4 Idle Hands	Pete Sutton	6 episodes
1976	Pressure	Dave	Film
1977	Headmaster	Wilf Farley	1 episode
1977	Nicholas Nickleby	Master Cummins	1 episode (mini series)
1977	Play for Today	Eckersley	"Scum!"
1977	The Sunday Drama	Zack	"A Good Story"
1978	The Tomorrow People	Blitz	"Hitler's Last Stand" (2 episodes)
1978	Twenty Times More Likely	Alan	Short film
1979	Graham's Gang	Russ	1 episode
1979	The Music Machine	Joe	Film
1979	Scum!	Eckersley	Film
1980	BBC2 Playhouse	Kevin	"Mary's Wife"
1980	Minder	Disco Youth	"Not a Bad Lad, Dad"
1980	Play for Today	Dunning	"The Vanishing Army"
1980	The Professionals	Vince	Episode: "Weekend in the Country"
1981	Going Out	Rick Tinnersley	5 episodes
1981	Triangle	Wolcott	4 episodes
1981	Wolcott	PC Brock	2 episodes
1982	Gandhi	Youth	Film
1983	The Baker Street Boys	PC Boot	2 episodes
1983-4	Now and Then	Randall	13 episodes
1984	Dream Stuffing	Richard	10 episodes
1984	Minder	Jimmy Randall	"Hypnotising Rita"
1984	The Gentle Touch	Joey Felix	Episode: Do It Yourself
1984	The Kit Curran Radio Show	Ray	Episode: Bread and Circuses
1985	C.A.T.S. Eyes	Mike	Episode: The Double Dutch Deal
1985-9	Three Up, Two Down	Nick Tyler	25 episodes
1994	Death Machine	Dead Diner	Film
1997-2000	Operation Good Guys	DS Ash	19 episodes
1998	Final Cut	Burdis	Film
2000	Love, Honour and Obey	Ray	Film
2000	Urban Gothic	The Colonel	Episode: The Boy's Club
2002-3	Manchild	Gary	4 episodes
2003	The Afternoon Play	Arnie Griffin	"The Real Arnie Griffin"
2004	Casualty	Alan 'Dusty' Binns	Episode: "Fallen Hero"
2005	My Hero	Detective Symes	Episode: "Nothing to Hide"
2021	To Be Someone	Dickson	Film
2024	Miss the Kiss	Detective Burke	Currently in Post Production

Director/ producer/ writer roles
Year	Film	Role	Notes
1975-6	You Must Be Joking!	Writer, Co-Creator	6 episodes
1979	You Can't Be Serious	Writer	
1987	Visiting Mr. Beak	Exectuve Producer	Short film
1988	The Fear	Writer	5 episodes
1988	The Universe of Dermot Finn	Co-Producer	Short film
1990	The Krays	Producer	
1990	The Reflecting Skin	Producer	
1993-4	The Spooks of Bottle Bay	Producer	18 episodes
1994	Death Machine	Co-Producer	
1995	The Passion of Darkly Noon	Exectuve Producer	
1997-2000	Operation Good Guys	Director, Producer	19 episodes
1998	Final Cut	Director, Producer, Writer	
2000	Love, Honour and Obey	Director, Producer, Writer	
2013	The Wee Man	Director, Writer	
2015	Angel	Director, Writer	
2021	To Be Somebody	Director, Producer, Writer	
2022	Kick Out the Jams: The Story of XFM	Director	Documentary
2024	Last Kings of London	Director, Writer	Currently in Post Production
2024	Miss the Kiss	Director, Writer	Currently in Post Production
2025	Last Tandem in Paris	Director	Currently in Production
